This is a list of notable professional male mixed martial arts fighters in alphabetical order.



A
  Shamil Abdurakhimov - (M-1, UFC)
  Daichi Abe - (UFC, Pancrase)
  Hiroyuki Abe - (Shooto, KOTC, Cage Rage, DEEP, Pride)
  Papy Abedi - (UFC, Shooto)
  Cyril Abidi - (K-1)
  Klidson Abreu - (UFC, Brave Combat Federation, M-1 Global, Jungle Fight)
  Daniel Acácio - (Pride, M-1, Shooto, Jungle Fight, KSW)
  Bernard Ackah - (DEEP, K-1 Hero's)
  Akihiko Adachi - (Shooto)
  Israel Adesanya - (UFC)
  Sam Adkins - (UFC)
  Peter Aerts - (K-1, K-1 Hero's)
  AJ Agazarm - (Bellator)
  Bashir Ahmad - (OneFC)
  Katsuhisa Akasaki - (Shooto)
  Omari Akhmedov - (UFC)
  Jin Akimoto - (Shooto)
  Yoshihiro Akiyama - (K-1, K-1 Hero's, DREAM, UFC)
  Mostapha Al-Turk - (Cage Rage, UFC)
  Tony Alanis - (WEC)
  John Albert - (UFC)
  Junior Albini - (UFC)
  Ildemar Alcântara - (Jungle Fight, UFC)
  Iuri Alcântara - (Jungle Fight, WEC, UFC)
  Hector Aldana - (UFC)
  José Aldo - (Shooto, Jungle Fight, Pancrase, WEC, UFC)
  John Alessio - (DREAM, KOTC, Pancrase, PRIDE, UFC, WEC, MFC, TPF, Bellator)
  Houston Alexander - (Adrenaline MMA, KSW, UFC, Bellator,OneFC)
  Cosmo Alexandre - (Bellator, OneFC)
  Olaf Alfonso - (TPF, PFC, PRIDE, WEC)
  Royce Alger - (UFC)
  Amir Aliakbari - (RIZIN, ACB)
  Sultan Aliev - (Bellator, UFC)
  Ben Alloway - (UFC, CWFC)
  Ricardo Almeida - (Pancrase, PRIDE, UFC)
  Thomas Almeida - (UFC, Legacy)
  Eddie Alvarez - (OneFC, UFC, Bellator, DREAM, EliteXC, ShoXC)
  Sean Alvarez - (RINGS, KOTC, UFC)
  Thiago Alves - (KOTC, UFC)
  Warlley Alves - (UFC, Jungle Fight)
  Sam Alvey - (KOTC, Bellator, MFC, UFC)
  Andre Amade - (DREAM, K-1 Hero's)
  Adlan Amagov - (Strikeforce, UFC)
  Raul Amaya - (Bellator)
  Jimmy Ambriz - (KOTC, MFC, Pancrase, K-1 Hero's, WEC, TPF, SFL)
  J. J. Ambrose - (Affliction, Bellator)
  Makwan Amirkhani - (UFC)
  Karl Amoussou - (Pancrase, M-1, DREAM, CWFC, Strikeforce, Bellator)
  Bertrand Amoussou-Guenou - (PRIDE)
  Eryk Anders - (UFC, LFC, Bellator)
  Corey Anderson - (UFC)
  Derek Anderson - (Bellator)
  Viscardi Andrade - (Jungle Fight, UFC)
  Dylan Andrews - (UFC)
  Reese Andy - (IFL, UFC)
  Yoji Anjo - (PRIDE, DEEP, UFC)
  Magomed Ankalaev - (UFC)
  Gadzhimurad Antigulov - (ACB, UFC)
  Kelly Anundson - (Bellator)
  Shinya Aoki - (DEEP, DREAM, PRIDE, Shooto, OneFC, Bellator)
  Erik Apple - (KOTC, WEC, ShoXC, Strikeforce)
  Felipe Arantes - (UFC)
  Igor Araujo - (UFC, M-1, Shooto)
  Andrei Arlovski - (Affliction, M-1, Strikeforce, EliteXC, UFC, OneFC, WSOF)
  Ricardo Arona - (PRIDE, RINGS)
  Chalid Arrab - (K-1 Hero's, M-1, PRIDE)
  Matt Arroyo - (UFC)
  Josh Appelt - (Bellator)
  Noboru Asahi - (DEEP, Shooto, VTJ)
  Askar Askarov - (ACB, UFC)
  Cyril Asker - (UFC)
  Ben Askren - (Bellator, OneFC)
  Junior Assunção - (UFC, XFC, KOTC)
  Raphael Assunção - (WEC, UFC)
  Bazigit Atajev - (K-1 Hero's, Shooto, PRIDE, RINGS)
  Rich Attonito - (KOTC, UFC)
  Olivier Aubin-Mercier - (UFC)
  Fernando Augusto
  Marcus Aurélio - (KOTC, PRIDE, UFC, DREAM)
  Blas Avena - (WEC, Bellator)
  David Avellan - (WEC)
  Saad Awad - (Bellator, Strikeforce, KOTC)
  Javy Ayala - (Bellator)
  Navid Abdolmaleki - (UFC) 
  Luiz Azeredo - (Bellator, Jungle Fight, Cage Rage, PRIDE, Shooto)

B
  Yoichi "Wakashoyo Shunichi" Babaguchi - (K-1 Hero's, DEEP)
  Danaa Batgerel - (UFC, LFC)
  Niklas Bäckström - (UFC, CWFC)
  Seth Baczynski - (UFC, IFL, TPF, XFC)
  Ryan Bader - (KOTC, UFC, Bellator)
  Ali Bagautinov - (UFC)
  Siyar Bahadurzada - (Shooto, Strikeforce, Sengoku, UFC)
  Ignacio Bahamondes - (UFC)
  Shamar Bailey - (UFC, Strikeforce, Bellator, KOTC, M-1, XFC)
  Bryan Baker - (KOTC, WEC, MFC, Bellator)
  Oluwale Bamgbose - (UFC)
  Antonio Banuelos - (DREAM, PFC, WEC, UFC, TPF)
  Renan Barão - (Shooto, Jungle Fight, WEC, UFC)
  Bryan Barberena - (UFC)
  Edson Barboza - (UFC)
  Mehdi Barghi - (ONE)
  Luke Barnatt - (BAMMA, UFC, ACB)
  Josh Barnett - (Affliction, Pancrase, PRIDE, UFC, Sengoku, DREAM, Strikeforce)
  David Baron - (PRIDE, Shooto, CWFC, UFC)
  Phil Baroni - (Cage Rage, EliteXC, PRIDE, PFC, Strikeforce, UFC, Titan FC, OneFC, Bellator)
  Carlos Barreto - (IVC, UFC, PRIDE, RINGS, Jungle Fight, M-1)
  Jason Barrett - (Cage Rage)
  Francimar Barroso - (Shooto, UFC)
  Pat Barry - (UFC)
  Enrique Barzola - (UFC)
  Duane Bastress - (Bellator)
  Chris Beal - (UFC)
  Rudy Bears - (Bellator, Strikeforce, M-1, Titan FC)
  Johnny Bedford - (UFC, Bellator, LFA)
  Chase Beebe - (KOTC, WEC, DREAM, Bellator)
  Lyle Beerbohm - (KOTC, ShoXC, Strikeforce, WSOF)
  Mirsad Bektić - (Titan FC, RFA, UFC)
  Alan Belcher - (UFC, Titan FC)
  Vitor Belfort - (Cage Rage, PRIDE, Affliction, Strikeforce, UFC)
  Kevin Belingon - (URCC, Legend FC, OneFC)
  Joey Beltran - (UFC, Bellator, KOTC, Strikeforce)
  Marco Beltrán - (UFC)
  Joseph Benavidez - (UFC, WEC, DREAM, PFC)
  Brandon Bender - (Bellator)
  Dave Beneteau - (UFC, KOTC)
  Eddy Bengtsson - (CWFC)
  Gabriel Benítez - (UFC)
  Charles "Krazy Horse" Bennett - (KOTC, PRIDE, ShoXC, EliteXC)
  Lance Benoist - (UFC)
  Ryan Benoit - (MFC, UFC)
  Steve Berger - (Shooto, KOTC, UFC, Strikeforce)
  Bret Bergmark - (Pancrase, Strikeforce, WEC)
  Dennis Bermudez - (UFC, M-1)
  Mike Bernardo
  Keith Berry - (Bellator, Strikeforce, KOTC, WEC, ShoXC)
  Matt Bessette - (Bellator)
  Alexandre Bezerra - (Bellator)
  Rony Mariano Bezerra - (UFC)
  Arjan Bhullar - (UFC)
  Magomed Bibulatov - (UFC, WSOF)
  David Bielkheden - (PRIDE, Cage Rage, CWFC, M-1, Shooto, UFC)
  Scott "Bam Bam" Bigelow
  Jonas Billstein - (Bellator)
  Michael Bisping - (Cage Rage, CWFC, UFC)
  Tariel Bitsadze - (RINGS)
  Todd Bjornethun - (Pancrase, Shooto, VTJ)
  Jan Blachowicz - (KSW, UFC)
  Jason Black - (UFC, PRIDE, WFA, KOTC)
  Brad Blackburn - (IFL, MFC, UFC, Bellator)
  Maximo Blanco - (UFC, Strikeforce, Sengoku, Pancrase)
  Curtis Blaydes - (UFC, RFA)
  Dan Bobish - (KOTC, PRIDE, UFC)
  Mark Bocek - (UFC, KOTC)
  Kyle Bochniak - (UFC)
  Tim Boetsch - (UFC, KOTC, IFL)
  Jerry Bohlander - (KOTC, UFC)
  Kotetsu Boku - (DREAM, K-1 Hero's, KOTC, Shooto, OneFC)
  Stephan Bonnar - (Jungle Fight, UFC, Bellator)
  Ray Borg - (KOTC, Legacy, UFC)
  Marcus Bossett - (UFC)
  Ryan Bow - (World Shooto)
  Brian Bowles - (WEC, UFC)
  Roger Bowling - (Strikeforce, UFC)
  Kyle Bradley - (UFC, Titan FC)
  Paul Bradley - (Bellator, UFC)
  Ebenezer Fontes Braga - (Pancrase, Jungle Fight, PRIDE, UFC)
  David Branch - (UFC, Bellator, WSOF, Titan FC)
  Diego Brandão - (UFC)
  Tom Breese - (UFC, BAMMA)
  Chris Brennan - (KOTC, PRIDE, UFC, Shooto, Cage Rage)
  Charlie Brenneman - (UFC, ShoXC)
  Jason Brilz - (UFC, KOTC, Titan FC)
  Marcus Brimage - (UFC)
  Henry Briones - (UFC, Legacy)
  Antwain Britt - (Strikeforce, YAMMA)
  Mike Bronzoulis - (Strikeforce, Bellator, Titan FC)
  Jonathan Brookins - (Bellator, WEC, UFC)
  Jarred Brooks - (Pancrase, UFC)
  Will Brooks - (Bellator, DREAM, UFC)
  Rob Broughton - (RINGS, Cage Rage, M-1, UFC)
  Damien Brown - (UFC)
  Matt Brown - (UFC)
  Mike Brown - (DEEP, WEC, UFC)
  Travis Browne - (KOTC, Bellator, UFC)
  Justin Bruckmann - (Shooto)
  Steve Bruno - (UFC, IFL, MFC)
  Derek Brunson - (Strikeforce, UFC)
  Justin Buchholz - (EliteXC, UFC)
  Zak Bucia - (Strikeforce, KOTC)
  Courtney Buck - (WEC, KOTC)
  Mike Budnik - (KOTC, WEC)
  Paul Buentello - (KOTC, Strikeforce, Affliction, UFC, Legacy, Bellator)
  Shawn Bunch - (Bellator)
  Shane Burgos - (UFC)
  Josh Burkman - (UFC, WSOF)
  Mikey Burnett - (UFC)
  Gilbert Burns - (UFC)
  Kevin Burns - (UFC)
  Nah-Shon Burrell - (Strikeforce, UFC, Bellator)
  Murilo Bustamante - (DEEP, Pancrase, Pride, UFC)
  Jason Butcher - (Bellator)
  Raphael Butler - (Bellator)

C
  Alex Caceres - (KOTC, UFC)
  Darrion Caldwell - (Bellator)
  Frank Camacho - (UFC)
  Fabrício Camões - (UFC, Strikeforce, ShoXC, TPF)
  Brian Camozzi - (UFC, RFA)
  Chris Camozzi - (UFC, MFC)
  Shane Campbell - (MFC, WSOF)
  Derek Campos - (Bellator, KOTC)
  Will Campuzano - (UFC, WEC, VTJ)
  Chico Camus - (UFC, RFA)
  Luiz Cané - (UFC)
  Guido Cannetti - (UFC)
  Jared Cannonier - (UFC)
  Jose Canseco - (DREAM)
  Steve Cantwell - (UFC, WEC, Jungle Fight)
  Frank Caraballo - (Bellator)
  Bryan Caraway - (UFC, WEC, Strikeforce, EliteXC)
  Phil Cardella - (WEC)
  Chris Cariaso - (UFC, WEC, Strikeforce, ShoXC)
  Steve Carl - (M-1, Bellator, WSOF)
  Antônio Carlos Júnior - (UFC)
  Francis Carmont - (KSW, UFC)
  Roan Carneiro - (UFC, Shooto, DEEP)
  Tim Carpenter - (Bellator)
  Shonie Carter - (UFC, WEC, Pancrase, Shooto, Bellator, KOTC, MFC, KSW, M-1)
  Antonio Carvalho - (UFC, Shooto, MFC)
  Shane Carwin - (UFC, WEC)
  Johnny Case - (RFA, UFC)
  Kevin Casey - (UFC, Strikeforce, RFA, K-1 Hero's, Bellator)
  Bendy Casimir - (M-1, Shooto, WEC, Cage Rage, CWFC)
  Danny Castillo - (UFC, WEC, PFC)
  Gil Castillo - (WEC, KOTC, UFC)
  Raul Castillo - (Strikeforce)
  Tim Catalfo - (PRIDE, KOTC)
  Nick Catone - (UFC)
  Luke Caudillo - (UFC, Strikeforce)
  Gesias Cavalcante - (K-1 Hero's, Shooto, DREAM, Cage Rage, CWFC, Strikeforce, WSOF)
  Rafael Cavalcante - (UFC, Strikeforce, EliteXC, IFL)
  Magnus Cedenblad - (UFC)
  Yosdenis Cedeno - (UFC)
  Henry Cejudo - (LFA, UFC)
  Donald Cerrone - (WEC, UFC)
  Jason Chambers - (DEEP)
  Michael Chandler - (Strikeforce, Bellator)
  Dan Charles - (Bellator)
  Ernest Chavez - (UFC)
  Rick Cheek - (PFC)
  Michael Chiesa - (UFC)
  Sako Chivitchian - (UFC)
  Doo Ho Choi - (M-1, Sengoku, DEEP, UFC)
  Hong Man Choi - (DREAM, K-1, K-1 Hero's)
  Mu Bae Choi - (PRIDE, Sengoku, K-1 Hero's, Pancrase)
  John Cholish - (UFC, Strikeforce)
  Ryo Chonan - (DEEP, Pancrase, Sengoku, DREAM, PRIDE, UFC)
  Joachim Christensen - (UFC, M1 Challenge)
  Dan Christison - (IFL, KOTC, WEC, UFC)
  Branko Cikatić - (PRIDE)
  Misha Cirkunov - (UFC)
  Devin Clark - (UFC, RFA)
  LaVerne Clark - (UFC, RINGS, Pancrase, WFA, DEEP, KOTC, MFC)
  Logan Clark - (UFC, WEC, Sengoku)
  Mitch Clarke - (UFC, KOTC)
  Rich Clementi - (UFC, Bellator, DREAM, K-1 Hero's, Adrenaline MMA, Titan FC)
  Chris Clements - (UFC)
  Dakota Cochrane - (Adrenaline MMA, Titan FC)
  Felipe Colares - (UFC, Jungle Fight)
  Devin Cole - (Strikeforce, IFL, PFC, WSOF)
  Cortez Coleman - (Strikeforce, KOTC, Bellator)
  Mark "The Hammer" Coleman - (PRIDE, UFC)
  Jake Collier - (UFC, RFA)
  Vuyisile Colossa - (OneFC)
  Carlos Condit - (KOTC, UFC, WEC, Pancrase)
  Alex Cook - (Pancrase, VTJ, Shooto)
  T. J. Cook - (Strikeforce)
  Brett Cooper - (Bellator, Affliction, Jungle Fight, IFL, Shooto)
  Dewey Cooper - (Strikeforce, PFC)
  Ray Cooper III - (PFL)
  Chris Cope - (UFC, Strikeforce)
  Kit Cope - (UFC, WEC, WFA)
  Akira Corassani - (UFC, Shooto)
  Mike Corey - (Bellator, IFL, KOTC, WSOF)
  Daniel Cormier - (KOTC, Strikeforce, UFC)
  Wesley Correira - (RINGS, EliteXC, UFC, WEC)
  Paulo Costa - (UFC, Jungle Fight)
  Patrick Côté - (KOTC, MFC, UFC)
  Randy "The Natural" Couture - (UFC, VTJ, RINGS)
  Ryan Couture - (UFC, Strikeforce, Bellator)
  Colby Covington - (UFC)
  Nathan Coy - (Strikeforce, MFC, Bellator)
  Andrew Craig - (UFC, Bellator)
  Paul Craig - (UFC, BAMMA)
  Dan Cramer - (UFC, Bellator)
  Alberto Crane - (KOTC, UFC)
  Tim Credeur - (UFC, KOTC)
  Paul Creighton - (UFC)
  Daron Cruickshank - (UFC, KOTC)
  Richard Crunkilton - (UFC, WEC)
  Dominick Cruz - (UFC, WEC)
  Márcio Cruz - (Sengoku, IFL, UFC)
  Abel Cullum - (KOTC, ShoXC, DREAM)
  Zak Cummings - (UFC, MFC, Bellator, Titan FC)
  Patrick Cummins - (UFC)
  Luke Cummo - (UFC)
  João Cunha
  Jeff Curran - (IFL, KOTC, PRIDE, WEC, WFA, Bellator, UFC, Strikeforce)
  Pat Curran - (Bellator, Adrenaline MMA)
  Ion Cuțelaba - (UFC)

D
  Genair da Silva - (Bellator)
  Henrique da Silva - (UFC)
  Paul Daley - (UFC, Strikeforce, Bellator, Cage Rage, BAMMA, ShoXC, MFC, CWFC)
  Rodrigo Damm - (UFC, Strikeforce, Sengoku, Shooto)
  Raymond Daniels - (Strikeforce)
  Alexandre Dantas - (UFC)
  Eduardo Dantas - (Shooto, Bellator)
  Mac Danzig - (WEC, KOTC, PRIDE, UFC)
  Karen Darabedyan - (WEC)
  Beneil Dariush - (UFC)
  Viacheslav Datsik - (M-1)
  Chris Davis - (Bellator, Adrenaline MMA, XFC)
  LC Davis - (WEC, Sengoku, Affliction, IFL, Adrenaline MMA, Bellator, Titan FC)
  Marcus Davis - (UFC, MFC, Bellator)
  Phil Davis - (PFC, UFC)
  Raphael Davis - (Bellator, M-1, IFL, Titan FC)
  Jason Day - (UFC, KOTC, MFC)
  Phil De Fries - (UFC)
  Omar de la Cruz - (Bellator, Sengoku)
  Chris de la Rocha - (UFC)
  Mike De La Torre - (UFC)
  Johil de Oliveira - (PRIDE, Cage Rage, Shooto, Jungle Fight)
  Shane Del Rosario - (UFC, Strikeforce, ShoXC, M-1, KOTC)
  Herb Dean - (KOTC, Cage Rage)
  Tom DeBlass - (Bellator, UFC)
  Ramon Dekkers - (K-1 Hero's)
  Rolando Delgado - (UFC, Bellator, Shooto)
  Roland Delorme - (UFC)
  Roland Delorme - (UFC)
  Jon Delos Reyes - (UFC)
  Chris Dempsey - (UFC, Bellator)
  Nick Denis - (UFC, KOTC, Sengoku)
  Jason Dent - (UFC, KOTC)
  Tony DeSouza - (UFC, Jungle Fight, WFA)
  Cory Devela - (Strikeforce)
  Edwin Dewees - (KOTC, UFC, Affliction, MFC)
  Cyrille Diabaté - (PRIDE, Cage Rage, ShoXC, UFC, PFC, TPF, M-1, DEEP, RINGS)
  Ousmane Thomas Diagne - (Strikeforce)
  Hacran Dias - (Jungle Fight, Pancrase, Shooto, M-1, UFC)
  Nate Diaz - (WEC, Strikeforce, UFC)
  Nick Diaz - (PRIDE, Shooto, DREAM, UFC, WEC, EliteXC, Strikeforce)
  Alessio Di Chirico - (IMMAF, UFC)
  Josh Diekmann - (WEC, Bellator)
  T.J. Dillashaw - (UFC, KOTC)
  Rosen Dimitrov - (M-1, Shooto)
  Rumen Dimitrov - (Shooto)
  Russell Doane - (KOTC, TPF, UFC)
  Drew Dober - (Bellator, Titan FC, UFC)
  John Dodson - (UFC, KOTC)
  Joe Doerksen - (DEEP, IFL, WEC, KOTC, RINGS, Sengoku, UFC)
  C.B. Dollaway - (UFC)
  Cody Donovan - (Bellator, UFC)
  Rafael dos Anjos - (UFC, Pancrase, Shooto)
  Junior dos Santos - (UFC)
  David Douglas - (EliteXC, ShoXC, Strikeforce)
  Danny Downes - (UFC, WEC, KOTC)
  Jared Downing - (Bellator)
  Tomasz Drwal - (UFC)
  Robert Drysdale - (UFC)
  Joe Duarte - (Strikeforce, Bellator)
  Todd Duffee - (UFC, SFL, Jungle Fight, DREAM)
  Kelly Dullanty - (UFC, KOTC)
  Evan Dunham - (PFC, UFC)
  Dricus du Plessis - (EFC)
  Tom Duquesnoy - (BAMMA, UFC)
  Reuben Duran - (UFC, KOTC)
  Matt Dwyer - (UFC)

E
  Marvin Eastman - (KOTC, MFC, UFC, WFA, Shooto)
  Mike Easton - (UFC)
  Brian Ebersole - (UFC, IFL, Shooto, KOTC, Strikeforce)
  Mark Eddiva - (UFC)
  Frankie Edgar - (UFC)
  Carlos Eduardo - (Bellator, Shooto)
  Johnny Eduardo - (UFC, Bellator, Jungle Fight, Shooto, VTJ)
  Justin Edwards - (UFC, Bellator)
  Leon Edwards - (UFC, BAMMA)
  Yves Edwards - (KOTC, UFC, Shooto, WEC, PRIDE, EliteXC, Strikeforce, MFC, Bellator)
  Justin Eilers - (UFC, WEC, EliteXC)
  Jon Olav Einemo - (UFC, Shooto, PRIDE)
  Per Eklund - (M-1, Shooto, UFC)
  Darren Elkins - (UFC)
  Jake Ellenberger - (UFC, IFL, Bellator, M-1, KOTC)
  Tim Elliott - (UFC, Titan FC, RFA)
  Jason Ellis 
  Aleksander Emelianenko - (M-1, PRIDE)
  Fedor Emelianenko - (PRIDE, RINGS, Affliction, Strikeforce, M-1, Bellator)
  Rob Emerson - (Pancrase, Shooto, UFC, KOTC, DEEP, TPF, Bellator)
  Josh Emmett - UFC, KOTC
  Yasubey Enomoto - (Sengoku, M-1)
  Tom Erikson - (K-1 Hero's, PRIDE, VTJ)
  Eric "Butterbean" Esch - (Cage Rage, K-1, KOTC, PRIDE, PFC, KSW, YAMMA)
  Cole Escovedo - (WEC, IFL, PFC, Strikeforce, TPF, DREAM, UFC)
  Efrain Escudero - (UFC, TPF, Bellator)
  Jordan Espinosa - (UFC)
  Braulio Estima - (Titan FC)
  Terry Etim - (UFC, Bellator)
  Billy Evangelista - (Strikeforce, WEC, PFC)
  Doug Evans - (Bellator, ShoXC, UFC)
  Rashad Evans - (UFC)
  Dan Evensen - (UFC, Bellator)

F
  Edward Faaloloto - (UFC, WEC, Pancrase)
  Urijah Faber - (KOTC, WEC, UFC)
  Wagnney Fabiano - (IFL, WEC, Bellator)
  Maiquel Falcão - (UFC, Bellator, KSW)
  Gustavo Falciroli - (Shooto, OneFC)
  Brodie Farber - (UFC)
  Paul Felder - (UFC)
  Kevin "Kimbo Slice" Ferguson - (EliteXC, UFC)
  Tony Ferguson - (UFC)
  Bibiano Fernandes - (Jungle Fight, KOTC, K-1 Hero's, DREAM, OneFC)
  Alexandre Ferreira - (UFC, IFL, Jungle Fight, RINGS)
  Carlos Diego Ferreira - (Legacy, UFC)
  Cezar Ferreira - (UFC)
  Scott Ferrozzo - (UFC)
  Drew Fickett - (KOTC, UFC, Cage Rage, Strikeforce, MFC, DREAM, XFC)
  Deiveson Figueiredo - (UFC, Jungle Fight)
  Edwin Figueroa - (UFC)
  Paulo Filho - (DEEP, Pancrase, PRIDE, DREAM, WEC, WSOF)
  Andre Fili - (UFC, KOTC, TPF)
  Mirko "Cro Cop" Filipović - (PRIDE, UFC, DREAM, RIZIN, Bellator)
  Perry Filkins - (Bellator)
  Luigi Fioravanti - (UFC, MFC, M-1 Global)
  Luiz Firmino - (DREAM, M-1 Global, PRIDE, Shooto, WSOF)
  Jason Fischer - (Bellator)
  Spencer Fisher - (UFC)
  Jon Fitch - (Shooto, UFC, WSOF)
  Colin Fletcher - (UFC, BAMMA)
  Kenny Florian - (UFC)
  Caros Fodor - (KOTC, Strikeforce, UFC, OneFC)
  Eduard Folayang - (URCC, OneFC)
  Jesse Forbes - (UFC, WEC, MFC)
  Ryan Ford - (MFC, Bellator, WSOF)
  Jussier Formiga - (Shooto, TPF, UFC)
  Renee Forte - (UFC, Jungle Fight, Shooto)
  Brian Foster - (UFC, CWFC, Titan FC)
  Kenny Foster - (Bellator)
  Hermes França - (K-1 Hero's, Shooto, UFC, WEC, MFC)
  John Franchi - (IFL, WEC)
  Rich Franklin - (UFC, WFA)
  Zane Frazier - (UFC, Shooto, RINGS, KOTC, WEC)
  Ian Freeman - (Cage Rage, CWFC, M-1, Pancrase, UFC)
  Patricio Freire - (Bellator)
  Patricky Freire - (Bellator)
  Willamy Freire - (UFC, Shooto, DREAM, VTJ)
  Clay French - (KOTC, Sengoku, PRIDE, Adrenaline MMA, Titan FC, XFC)
  Don Frye - (K-1, K-1 Hero's, PRIDE, KOTC, UFC, DEEP)
  Tony Fryklund - (UFC, WEC, Strikeforce, Cage Rage, Titan FC, Bellator)
  Yutaka Fuji - (Shooto)
  Katsuhisa Fujii - (Shooto, UFC, Pancrase, DEEP, RINGS, PRIDE, M-1)
  Mitsuo Fujikura - (Shooto)
  Kazuyuki Fujita - (K-1, PRIDE, Sengoku)
  Yuji Fujita - (Shooto)
  Keisuke Fujiwara - (DREAM, Shooto)
  Masato Fujiwara - (Shooto)
  Riki Fukuda - (DEEP, EliteXC, DREAM, K-1 UFC)
  Satoshi Fukuoka - (Shooto)
  Travis Fulton - (UFC, WEC, KOTC, IFL, Pancrase, RINGS)
  Masakatsu Funaki - (Pancrase, K-1 Hero's, DREAM, RINGS)
  Ricardo Funch - (UFC)
  Ricardo Fyeet - (RINGS)

G
  Mitch Gagnon - (UFC)
  Zelg Galešić - (Cage Rage, PRIDE, DREAM, Bellator, SFL, K-1 Hero's)
  Vener Galiev - (M-1)
  Mickey Gall - (UFC)
  André Galvão - (Strikeforce, DREAM)
  Marcos Galvão - (Shooto, Jungle Fight, WEC, Bellator)
  Mauro Galvão - (Shooto, Jungle Fight)
  Manvel Gamburyan - (UFC, WEC, KOTC)
  Alex Garcia - (UFC)
  Edgar Garcia - (WEC, UFC, Bellator, TPF)
  Leonard Garcia - (UFC, WEC)
  Steve Garcia - (Bellator)
  Cody Garbrandt - (UFC)
  Pablo Garza - (KOTC, WEC, UFC)
  Kelvin Gastelum - (UFC)
  Louis Gaudinot - (UFC)
  Chad George - (WEC, TPF)
  Kamen Georgiev - (Shooto)
  Tiki Ghosn - (WEC, UFC, WFA, KOTC, Strikeforce)
  Cody Gibson - (UFC, TPF)
  Lance Gibson - (UFC, Shooto)
  Kultar Gill - (DREAM, Shooto, K-1 Hero's, MFC, SFL)
  Bob Gilstrap - (UFC)
  Brandon Girtz - (Bellator)
  Konstantin Gluhov - (K-1, M-1, KSW, Pancrase)
  Rodney Glunder - (RINGS, PRIDE, Cage Rage, M-1, KSW, AOW)
  Mark Godbeer - (BAMMA, UFC)
  Allan Goes - (IFL, Pancrase, PRIDE, UFC)
  Bakouri Gogitidze - (RINGS)
  Bryan Goldsby - (Bellator, Adrenaline MMA, Titan FC, PFC)
  Sergey Golyaev - (M-1, Shooto, Sengoku)
  Anthony Gomez - (Bellator)
  Frank Gomez - (WEC)
  Mikey Gomez - (EliteXC, XFC, Bellator)
  Ulysses Gomez - (UFC, Bellator, TPF, PFC)
  Takanori Gomi - (PRIDE, Shooto, VTJ, Sengoku, UFC)
  Akihiro Gono - (DEEP, Pancrase, PRIDE, Shooto, UFC, Sengoku, Bellator)
  Gabriel Gonzaga - (Shooto, Jungle Fight, UFC)
  Fernando Gonzalez - (WEC, KOTC, Strikeforce, Bellator)
  Lyman Good - (IFL, CFFC, Bellator, UFC)
  Herbert Goodman - (Bellator, M-1, KOTC)
  Gary Goodridge - (K-1, K-1 Hero's, PRIDE, Affliction, UFC)
  Gerard Gordeau - (UFC, VTJ)
  Eddie Gordon - (UFC)
  Jared Gordon - (CFFC, UFC)
  Jonathan Goulet - (KOTC, UFC)
  Wilson Gouveia - (UFC, MFC, KOTC)
  Damian Grabowski - (Bellator, M-1, UFC)
  Daniel Gracie - (Bellator, PRIDE)
  Neiman Gracie - (WSOF, Bellator)
  Ralek Gracie - (DREAM, K-1 Hero's)
  Renzo Gracie - (PRIDE, RINGS, K-1, IFL, EliteXC, UFC)
  Rickson Gracie - (PRIDE, VTJ)
  Rodrigo Gracie - (PRIDE, K-1 Hero's)
  Roger Gracie - (Sengoku, Strikeforce, UFC, OneFC)
  Rolles Gracie - (IFL, AOW, UFC, OneFC, WSOF)
  Royce Gracie - (K-1, K-1 Hero's, PRIDE, UFC)
  Royler Gracie - (VTJ, PRIDE, K-1 Hero's)
  Ryan Gracie - (PRIDE)
  Peter Graham - (Sengoku, AOW, Bellator, KSW)
  T. J. Grant - (KOTC, UFC)
  Sergej Grecicho - (Bellator, Shooto, K-1 Hero's, CWFC, KSW)
  Sam Greco - (K-1, K-1 Hero's)
  Bobby Green - (Strikeforce, Affliction, KOTC, TPF, UFC)
  Desmond Green - (Bellator, Titan FC, UFC)
  Matt Grice - (UFC)
  Forrest Griffin - (KOTC, UFC)
  Tyson Griffin - (Strikeforce, UFC, WSOF)
  Chad Griggs - (UFC, Strikeforce, IFL)
  Josh Grispi - (WEC, UFC)
  Kendall Grove - (KOTC, UFC, KSW, Bellator)
  Neil Grove - (Bellator, Cage Rage, UFC, SFL)
  Vik Grujic - (UFC)
  Fabrício Guerreiro - (Bellator)
  Shannon Gugerty - (UFC)
  Clay Guida - (KOTC, Shooto, WEC, UFC, Strikeforce)
  Jason Guida - (ShoXC, Adrenaline MMA, WEC, KSW, Bellator)
  Melvin Guillard - (UFC, WSOF, Bellator)
  Marcelo Guimarães - (UFC, Jungle Fight)
  John Gunderson - (IFL, UFC, PFC, TPF, WSOF)
  Fabio Gurgel - (UFC)
  Jorge Gurgel - (KOTC, UFC, Strikeforce, Titan FC)
  Alexander Gustafsson - (UFC, KSW, Shooto)
  Mike Guymon - (UFC, KOTC, Bellator)

H
  Keith Hackney - (UFC)
  Damir Hadzovic - (UFC, CWFC)
  Tim Hague (†)- (KOTC, UFC, MFC, WSOF)
  Rich Hale - (Bellator)
  Mark Hall - (UFC)
  Ryan Hall - (UFC)
  Uriah Hall - (UFC, Bellator)
  Dennis Hallman - (UFC, Strikeforce, MFC, Shooto, WFA, IFL, KOTC, WSOF, Titan FC)
  Piotr Hallmann - (UFC, CWFC)
  Tony Halme - (UFC, RINGS)
  Brandon Halsey - (Bellator, KOTC)
  Kazuhiro Hamanaka - (Pancrase, M-1, IFL, K-1 Hero's, PRIDE)
  Matt Hamill - (UFC, WSOF)
  Anthony Hamilton - (MFC, UFC)
  Anthony Hamlett - (WEC, Shooto)
  Jared Hamman - (WSOF, UFC, ShoXC, Strikeforce)
  Volk Han - (RINGS)
  Joachim Hansen - (Shooto, DEEP, K-1 Hero's, PRIDE, DREAM)
  Antoni Hardonk - (RINGS, K-1, UFC)
  Dan Hardy - (CWFC, KOTC, UFC)
  Gerald Harris - (UFC, DREAM, TPF, Titan FC, WSOF)
  Phil Harris - (Cage Rage, BAMMA, UFC, CWFC)
  Walt Harris - (UFC, Titan FC)
  Dale Hartt - (UFC)
  Clay Harvison - (UFC, Bellator)
  Lee Hasdell - (RINGS, Cage Rage)
  Carlton Haselrig - (EliteXC)
  Chris Haseman - (UFC, RINGS, WFA)
  Daiki Hata - (Pancrase, DEEP, DREAM)
  John Hathaway - (UFC, Cage Rage)
  Rick Hawn - (Bellator)
  Tomoaki Hayama - (Shooto)
  Mike Hayes - (Strikeforce, PFC, CWFC, Bellator, KSW)
  Josh Haynes - (UFC, IFL)
  Dustin Hazelett - (KOTC, UFC)
  James Head - (UFC)
  Pat Healy - (KOTC, MFC, WEC, Titan FC, IFL, Strikeforce, UFC)
  Ryan Healy - (WEC, Strikeforce, KOTC, MFC, SFL)
  David Heath - (KOTC, MFC, UFC)
  Jake Hecht - (UFC, CWFC)
  Nick Hein - (UFC)
  Marcin Held - (Bellator, Shooto, UFC)
  Benson Henderson - (MFC, WEC, UFC, Bellator)
  Dan Henderson - (RINGS, PRIDE, UFC, Strikeforce)
  Johny Hendricks - (WEC, UFC)
  Luis Henrique - (UFC, Shooto)
  Dave Herman - (UFC, Bellator, EliteXC, Sengoku, ShoXC, Titan FC)
  Ed Herman - (Pancrase, UFC, Strikeforce)
  Jack Hermansson - (UFC, Bellator, CWFC)
  Geane Herrera - (UFC, RFA)
  Heath Herring - (K-1 Hero's, PRIDE, UFC)
  Jared Hess - (Bellator)
  Jon Hess - (UFC)
  Clint Hester - (UFC)
  Jimy Hettes - (UFC)
  Conor Heun - (IFL, EliteXC, ShoXC, Strikeforce)
  Marcus Hicks - (WEC)
  Jay Hieron - (Bellator, WEC, IFL, Affliction, Strikeforce, UFC, Titan FC)
  Jason High - (UFC, Strikeforce, Affliction, DREAM, Titan FC)
  Corey Hill - (UFC, XFC, TPF)
  Jamahal Hill - (UFC)
  Branden Lee Hinkle - (UFC, RINGS, IVC, Pancrase, VTJ)
  Hatsu Hioki - (Shooto, PRIDE, Sengoku, UFC, RIZIN)
  Kuniyoshi Hironaka - (Pancrase, VTJ, DREAM, UFC, Shooto)
  Mizuto Hirota - (Shooto, Sengoku, Strikeforce, UFC)
  Matt Hobar - (UFC)
  Bobby Hoffman - (KOTC, RINGS, UFC, Jungle Fight)
  Sam Hoger - (UFC, IFL)
  Andrew Holbrook - (UFC)
  Mark Holata - (Bellator)
  Chris Holdsworth - (UFC)
  Roger Hollett - (MFC, Bellator, UFC)
  Max Holloway - (UFC)
  Patrick Holohan - (Pancrase, Cage Contender, UFC)
  Mark Holst - (UFC)
  Mark Hominick - (UFC, Affliction, WEC)
  Chris Honeycutt - (Bellator)
  Satoshi Honma - (PRIDE, UFC, Shooto, K-1)
  Darrell Horcher - (Bellator, UFC)
  Kyoji Horiguchi - (Shooto, VTJ, UFC, RIZIN)
  Jeremy Horn - (IFL, KOTC, Pancrase, PRIDE, UFC, WEC, RINGS, Adrenaline MMA, Bellator)
  Dan Hornbuckle - (Sengoku, Bellator, DEEP, Titan FC)
  Chris Horodecki - (Bellator, WEC, IFL)
  Matt Horwich - (UFC, Strikeforce, Bellator, IFL, BAMMA, KSW)
  Jeff Hougland - (UFC, WEC)
  Harold Howard - (UFC)
  John Howard - (UFC, IFL)
  Robert Howard
  Tom Howard - (Cage Rage, IFL, K-1)
  Shane Howell - (Bellator, KOTC, UFC)
  Roger Huerta - (UFC, Bellator, OneFC)
  Mark Hughes - (UFC)
  Matt Hughes - (UFC, Shooto, RINGS)
  Matt Hume - (Pancrase)
  Mark Hunt - (PRIDE, DREAM, UFC)
  Solomon Hutcherson - (UFC, MFC)

I
  Al Iaquinta - (UFC)
  Alexey Ignashov - (K-1)
  Fabiano Iha - (KOTC, PRIDE, UFC)
  Hisao Ikeda - (Shooto)
  Seichi Ikemoto - (DEEP, DREAM, PRIDE, Shooto)
  Junji Ikoma - (Shooto)
  Mikhail Ilyukhin - (PRIDE, RINGS, K-1 Hero's)
  Toby Imada - (WEC, KOTC, Bellator)
  Masakazu Imanari - (Pancrase, PRIDE, Cage Rage, DREAM, DEEP, OneFC)
  Brad Imes - (UFC, WEC, IFL, KOTC, Titan FC, PFC)
  Guto Inocente - (Shooto, Strikeforce, UFC)
  Egan Inoue - (Shooto, RINGS, PRIDE)
  Enson Inoue - (PRIDE, VTJ, Shooto, UFC)
  Naoki Inoue - (DEEP, UFC)
  Takeshi Inoue - (Shooto, DREAM, VTJ)
  James Irvin - (Strikeforce, WEC, UFC, TPF, KSW)
  Mitsuhiro Ishida - (PRIDE, DREAM, Strikeforce, Shooto, DEEP)
  Satoshi Ishii - (K-1, DREAM, Sengoku)
  Yoshimasa Ishikawa - (Shooto)
  Shintaro Ishiwatari - (Shooto, Pancrase, Sengoku, VTJ)
  Takashi Ishizaki - (Shooto)
  Tokimitsu Ishizawa - (DREAM, K-1 Hero's, PRIDE)
  Wallid Ismail - (PRIDE, UFC)
  Leandro Issa - (OneFC, UFC)
  Junji Ito - (Shooto)
  Takenori Ito - (Shooto)
  Yuji Ito - (Shooto)
  Blagoy Ivanov - (Sengoku, Bellator, WSOF)
  Hiroshi Izumi - (Sengoku, DREAM)

J
  Yves Jabouin - (WEC, UFC)
  Damon Jackson - (UFC, Bellator, KOTC, Legacy)
  Jeremy Jackson - (KOTC, UFC)
  Kevin Jackson - (UFC)
  Quinton "Rampage" Jackson - (KOTC, PRIDE, UFC, WFA, Bellator)
  Dustin Jacoby - (UFC, WSOF, Titan FC, Bellator)
  Ryan Janes - (UFC)
  Keith Jardine - (KOTC, MFC, Pancrase, UFC, Strikeforce)
  Antoine Jaoude - (K-1, IFL)
  Dave Jansen - (Bellator, WEC, M-1)
  Bubba Jenkins - (TPF, Bellator, ACB)
  Trent Jenkins - (RINGS, UFC)
  Steve Jennum - (UFC)
  Ryan Jensen - (UFC, Strikeforce, Bellator)
  Maciej Jewtuszko - (UFC, WEC, KSW)
  Ronald Jhun - (Shooto, Strikeforce, UFC, WFA, KOTC)
  Art Jimmerson - (UFC)
  Ryan Jimmo - (MFC, UFC)
  Brett Johns - (CWFC, Titan FC, UFC)
  Anthony Johnson - (UFC, WSOF, Titan FC)
  DaMarques Johnson - (UFC, KOTC)
  Demetrious Johnson - (OneFC, UFC, WEC, KOTC)
  Jordan Johnson - (UFC, RFA)
  Lavar Johnson - (Bellator, UFC, WEC, Strikeforce, PFC)
  Michael Johnson - (UFC, Titan FC)
  Timothy Johnson - (UFC, Bellator)
  Wesley Johnson - (Cage Rage)
  Brian Johnston - (UFC, Strikeforce)
  Jon "Bones" Jones - (UFC)
  Marcus Jones - (UFC)
  Nathan Jones - (PRIDE)
  Paul Jones - (UFC, Shooto)
  Kevin Jordan - (UFC, Strikeforce)
  Shawn Jordan - (UFC, Strikeforce, Bellator, WEC)
  Ivan Jorge - (UFC, Jungle Fight, M-1, Shooto)
  Scott Jorgensen - (UFC, WEC, ShoXC)
  Krzysztof Jotko - (UFC)
  Alan Jouban - (UFC, TPF, RFA)
  Charles Jourdain - (UFC)
  Jesse Juarez - (Bellator, Strikeforce, MFC)
  Luke Jumeau - (UFC)
  Bu Kyung Jung - (DREAM, DEEP)
  Chan Sung Jung - (UFC, WEC, Sengoku, DEEP, Pancrase)
  Myles Jury - (Shooto, KOTC, UFC)

K
  Hideki Kadowaki - (Shooto, Sengoku, DEEP)
  Martin Kampmann - (UFC, WFA, KOTC, CWFC)
  Masanori Kanehara - (K-1, K-1 Hero's, Shooto, Pancrase, Sengoku, DEEP, UFC)
  Denis Kang - (PRIDE, Pancrase, K-1, M-1, UFC, DREAM)
  Hiroyuki Kanno - (Shooto)
  Kyung Ho Kang - (UFC, DEEP, Sengoku)
  Manel Kape - (RIZIN, UFC)
  Georgi Karakhanyan - (WSOF, DREAM, Bellator, BAMMA, KOTC, TPF)
  Alex Karalexis - (WEC, UFC)
  Joop Kasteel - (RINGS)
  Calvin Kattar - (UFC, EliteXC)
  Tetsuji Kato - (Shooto, VTJ, DEEP, Strikeforce)
  Yukio Kawabe - (PRIDE, Pancrase)
  Kenji Kawaguchi - (Shooto)
  Yusuke Kawaguchi - (M-1, DEEP, DREAM, KSW)
  Tatsuya Kawajiri - (PRIDE, Shooto, Strikeforce, DREAM, UFC)
  Ryo Kawamura - (Pancrase, Sengoku, OneFC)
  Chris Kelades - (Bellator, UFC)
  Daniel Kelly - (UFC)
  Paul Kelly - (UFC, SFL, CWFC)
  Tim Kennedy - (WEC, IFL, Strikeforce, UFC)
  Mark Kerr - (UFC, PRIDE, IFL, Cage Rage, M-1, YAMMA)
  Will Kerr - (WEC)
  Ron Keslar - (Bellator)
  Rustam Khabilov - (UFC, OneFC, M-1)
  Mamed Khalidov - (Shooto, ShoXC, ACB, KSW, Sengoku)
  Sergei Kharitonov - (PRIDE, RINGS, K-1 Hero's, DREAM, Strikeforce, M-1, Bellator)
  Magomedrasul "Frodo" Khasbulaev - (Bellator, M-1)
  Ferrid Kheder - (Shooto, M-1, Bellator)
  Akira Kikuchi - (K-1 Hero's, Shooto)
  Katsunori Kikuno - (DEEP, DREAM, UFC)
  Sanae Kikuta - (VTJ, Pancrase, PRIDE, UFC, Sengoku, DEEP)
  Dong Hyun Kim - (DEEP, UFC)
  Dong Hyun Kim - (UFC)
  Jong Man Kim - (K-1 Hero's, Shooto, Sengoku, DEEP, M-1)
  Min Soo Kim - (K-1 Hero's)
  Jeremy Kimball - (UFC, RFA, Bellator)
  Rob Kimmons - (UFC, Shooto, WEC, Titan FC)
  Dustin Kimura - (UFC, KOTC)
  Koichiro Kimura - (VTJ)
  Taiei Kin - (K-1 Hero's, DREAM)
  Kyle Kingsbury - (UFC, KOTC)
  Koji Kitao - (PRIDE, UFC)
  Satoru Kitaoka - (Pancrase, Sengoku, DEEP, DREAM)
  Drakkar Klose - (UFC)
  Kevin Knabjian - (Shooto, WEC, Bellator)
  Jason Knight - (Titan FC, UFC)
  Fatih Kocamis - (M-1, PRIDE, RINGS)
  Erik Koch - (WEC, UFC)
  Junya Kodo - (Shooto, DREAM, VTJ)
  Toru Koga - (Shooto)
  Brad Kohler - (UFC, RINGS, DEEP)
  Hiroyuki Kojima - (Shooto)
  Naoto Kojima - (Shooto)
  Shinichi Kojima - (Shooto, OneFC)
  John Kolosci - (UFC, Strikeforce, Bellator, XFC)
  Yuki Kondo - (Pancrase, PRIDE, UFC, DEEP, Sengoku)
  Cheick Kongo - (UFC, Bellator, RINGS)
  Kritsada Kongsrichai - (OneFC) 
  Masayuki Kono - (Pancrase)
  Cole Konrad - (Bellator)
  Andrei Kopylov - (PRIDE, RINGS)
  Andrey Koreshkov - (Bellator)
  Tsuyoshi Kosaka - (RINGS, PRIDE, UFC, Pancrase, DEEP)
  Josh Koscheck - (UFC, Bellator)
  Naoyuki Kotani - (Pancrase, PRIDE, UFC)
  James Krause - (Bellator, WEC, Titan FC, UFC)
  Pascal Krauss - (UFC, CWFC, Shooto)
  Emil Kristev - (RINGS)
  Jörgen Kruth - (K-1, UFC)
  Nikita Krylov - (UFC, M-1)
  Misaki Kubota - (Shooto)
  Alexei Kudin - (Bellator, M-1, Shooto)
  Michael Kuiper - (UFC, Titan FC)
  Anton Kuivanen - (UFC, K-1 Hero's, Shooto)
  Kiichi Kunimoto - (UFC, Pancrase)
  Kiuma Kunioku - (Sengoku, DEEP, Pancrase, K-1 Hero's)
  Masakazu Kuramochi - (DEEP, Pancrase, Shooto)
  Eldar Kurtanidze - (PRIDE)
  Kazuhiro Kusayanagi - (Shooto, VTJ)
  Takuya Kuwabara - (Shooto)
  Mike Kyle - (KOTC, WEC, UFC, Pancrase, Strikeforce, WSOF)

L
  Achmed Labasanov - (RINGS, PRIDE)
  Ryan LaFlare - (UFC)
  Tim Lajcik - (UFC, Pancrase, WFA, RINGS)
  Ricardo Lamas - (UFC, WEC)
  Jason Lambert - (KOTC, UFC, WEC, Bellator)
  Aung La Nsang - (Bellator, CFFC, OneFC)
  Chad Laprise - (UFC, Bellator)
  Anthony Lapsley - (Bellator, ShoXC, KOTC, UFC)
  Lorenz Larkin - (Strikeforce, UFC, Bellator)
  Jeremy Larsen - (UFC)
  Brock Larson - (UFC, WEC, KOTC, OneFC)
  Bobby Lashley -  (Strikeforce, MFC, SFL, Bellator, Titan FC)
  Ilir Latifi - (UFC)
  Ole Laursen - (OneFC, K-1 Hero's, AOW)
  Jenel Lausa - (UFC)
  Dan Lauzon - (Affliction, UFC, WSOF)
  Joe Lauzon - (UFC)
  Muhammed "King Mo" Lawal - (Sengoku, M-1, Strikeforce, Bellator)
  Robbie Lawler - (EliteXC, IFL, KOTC, PRIDE, Strikeforce, UFC)
  Tom Lawlor - (UFC)
  Justin Lawrence -  (Strikeforce, UFC)
  Eric Lawson - (Strikeforce)
  Jani Lax - (Shooto, K-1 Hero's, M-1)
  Cung Le - (Strikeforce, UFC)
  Jérôme Le Banner - (K-1, K-1 Hero's)
  Chris Leben - (UFC, WEC)
  Justin Ledet - (UFC, Legacy)
  Vaughan Lee - (UFC, CWFC, Cage Rage)
  Dave Legeno - (Cage Rage)
  Ricky Legere - (Bellator, Strikeforce, KOTC, TPF)
  Thales Leites - (Shooto, Jungle Fight, MFC, UFC)
  Nik Lentz - (UFC)
  Anthony Leone - (Bellator, Strikeforce, WEC)
  Fabio Leopoldo - (Pancrase, IFL)
  Kimo Leopoldo - (Cage Rage, K-1, PRIDE, UFC, WFA)
  Brock Lesnar - (K-1 Hero's, UFC)
  Justin Levens - (PFC, IFL, WEC, UFC)
  Marcus LeVesseur - (UFC, Adrenaline MMA)
  Derrick Lewis - (LFA, Bellator, UFC)
  Jingliang Li - (UFC, Legend FC, AOW)
  Jess Liaudin - (Pancrase, KOTC, Cage Rage, UFC)
  Chuck "The Iceman" Liddell - (UFC, PRIDE, Golden Boy)
  Jushin Thunder Liger - (Pancrase)
  Scott Lighty - (Strikeforce, ShoXC, PFC)
  Hyun Gyu Lim - (DEEP, M-1, UFC)
  Daniel Lima - (Shooto)
  Dhiego Lima - (MFC, XFC, UFC, Titan FC)
  Douglas Lima - (Bellator, MFC, KOTC)
  Rodrigo Lima - (Bellator)
  Matt Lindland - (Cage Rage, IFL, UFC, WFA, Affliction, Strikeforce, KSW)
  Jake Lindsey - (Titan FC, UFC)
  John Lineker - (UFC, Jungle Fight, Shooto)
  Philipe Lins - (Bellator)
  Dean Lister - (KOTC, MFC, PRIDE, UFC)
  Abner Lloveras - (M-1, Shooto)
  John Lober - (KOTC, UFC, Pancrase)
  David Loiseau - (EliteXC, UFC, TPF, WSOF)
  Stephen Loman - (Brave CF, OneFC)
  Hector Lombard - (Bellator, EliteXC, UFC, DEEP, PRIDE)
  Jan Lomulder - (K-1, VTJ)
  Matthew Lopez - (UFC, KOTC, RFA)
  Nate Loughran - (UFC, TPF, PFC)
  Ian Loveland - (UFC, KOTC, IFL, VTJ, TPF)
  Waylon Lowe - (UFC, Bellator, XFC, WSOF)
  Chris Lozano - (Bellator)
  Duane Ludwig - (K-1, KOTC, Sengoku, Strikeforce, UFC)
  Alexandru Lungu - (PRIDE, Cage Rage, K-1)
  Travis Lutter - (Cage Rage, MFC, UFC)
  Chris Lytle - (Cage Rage, Pancrase, UFC, WEC)

M
  William Macário - (UFC)
  Jason MacDonald - (KOTC, MFC, UFC)
  Rob MacDonald - (UFC, MFC)
  Rory MacDonald - (UFC, KOTC, Bellator)
  Gustavo Machado - (Shooto, IFL, Pancrase, KOTC, DEEP, RINGS)
  Murad Machaev - (Bellator)
  Lyoto Machida - (NJPW, Jungle Fight, K-1, K-1 Hero's, WFA, UFC, Bellator)
  War Machine - (UFC, BAMMA, XFC, Bellator, TPF)
  Anthony Macias - (PRIDE, UFC)
  Reza Madadi - (UFC)
  Jon Madsen - (UFC)
  Akira Maeda - (RINGS)
  Yoshiro Maeda - (Pancrase, PRIDE, WEC, DREAM, DEEP, Sengoku)
  Leonardo Mafra - (UFC)
  Caio Magalhães - (UFC, Shooto)
  Vinicius Magalhães - (Strikeforce)
  Vinny Magalhães - (M-1, UFC, Titan FC)
  Neil Magny - (UFC)
  Rashid Magomedov - (M-1, UFC)
  Ruslan Magomedov - (Bellator, UFC)
  Zabit Magomedsharipov - (UFC)
  John Maguire - (BAMMA, Cage Rage, UFC, CWFC, KSW)
  Demian Maia - (UFC)
  Eduardo Maiorino - (K-1)
  John Makdessi - (UFC)
  Islam Makhachev - (UFC, M-1)
  Zach Makovsky - (Bellator, ShoXC, UFC, ACB)
  Nazareno Malegarie - (Bellator, Jungle Fight)
  Fábio Maldonado - (UFC)
  Nick Mamalis - (Bellator)
  Melvin Manhoef - (Cage Rage, K-1 Hero's, Strikeforce, DREAM, OneFC, KSW, Bellator)
  Ronnie Mann - (Bellator, Cage Rage, Sengoku, CWFC)
  Andre Mannaart - (Shooto, RINGS)
  Jimi Manuwa - (BAMMA, UFC)
  Cristiano Marcello - (UFC, PRIDE)
  Ronny Markes - (Shooto, UFC, WSOF)
  Rory Markham - (IFL, Adrenaline MMA, UFC)
  Nate Marquardt - (Pancrase, Strikeforce, UFC)
  Carmelo Marrero - (WEC, UFC, Bellator, XFC, IFL)
  Doug Marshall - (Bellator, SFL, WEC, PFC, TPF)
  Eliot Marshall - (UFC)
  Jack Marshman - (BAMMA, CWFC, UFC)
  Terry Martin - (Strikeforce, WEC, KOTC, Affliction, UFC, Adrenaline MMA, MFC, KSW)
  Tony Martin - (UFC)
  Alonzo Martinez - (Bellator, Adrenaline MMA, Titan FC, Strikeforce)
  Danny Martinez - (XFC, WEC, TPF, UFC)
  Henry Martinez - (Bellator, UFC)
  Jesus Martinez - (Bellator)
  Poppies Martinez - (Bellator, WEC, PFC, TPF)
  Rad Martinez - (Bellator, KOTC)
  Ryan Martinez - (Bellator)
  Will Martinez - (Bellator)
  Adriano Martins - (Jungle Fight, Strikeforce, UFC)
  Lucas Martins - (Jungle Fight, UFC)
  Wágner "Zuluzinho" da Conceição Martins - (K-1 Hero's, CWFC, PRIDE)
  Bristol Marunde - (UFC, Strikeforce, M-1, IFL, Titan FC)
  Mike Massenzio - (UFC, IFL)
  Jameel Massouh - (Bellator, KOTC, Pancrase, WEC, Adrenaline MMA)
  Jorge Masvidal - (Bellator, Sengoku, Strikeforce, UFC)
  Daijiro Matsui - (KOTC, Cage Rage, PRIDE, Pancrase, DEEP, AOW)
  Ryota Matsune - (Shooto)
  Hiroaki Matsutani - (Shooto)
  A.J. Matthews - (Bellator, Strikeforce)
  Jake Matthews - (UFC)
  Vladimir Matyushenko - (VTJ, Jungle Fight, Affliction, IFL, UFC, Bellator)
  Gray Maynard - (UFC)
  Ricardo Mayorga - (WSOF)
  Ian McCall - (WEC, TPF, UFC)
  Charles McCarthy - (KOTC, UFC)
  Sean McCorkle - (KOTC, UFC, KSW)
  Kris McCray - (UFC, Bellator, WSOF)
  Tamdan McCrory - (UFC, Bellator)
  Rob McCullough - (Bellator, WEC, DREAM, WFA, TPF)
  Justin McCully - (Pancrase, RINGS, Jungle Fight, UFC)
  Robert "Bubba" McDaniel - (UFC, KOTC, ShoXC, EliteXC)
  Michael McDonald - (UFC, WEC, PFC, TPF)
  Michael McDonald - (K-1)
  Adam McDonough - (Bellator, KOTC)
  Drew McFedries - (UFC, Shooto, Titan FC)
  Liam McGeary - (Bellator)
  Court McGee - (UFC)
  Gan McGee - (PRIDE, UFC, WEC, XFC)
  Conor McGregor - (CWFC, UFC)
  Antonio McKee - (KOTC, WFA, IFL, K-1 Hero's, MFC, UFC, DREAM, WSOF)
  Cody McKenzie - (UFC)
  Tim McKenzie - (UFC, WEC, Pancrase, TPF)
  James McSweeney - (Cage Rage, BAMMA, UFC, OneFC)
  Tim Means - (KOTC, UFC)
  Yancy Medeiros - (UFC, Strikeforce)
  Gerald Meerschaert - (UFC, KOTC)
  Derrick Mehmen - (Adrenaline MMA, Strikeforce, Bellator, WSOF)
  Jordan Mein - (KOTC, Strikeforce, UFC)
  Brian Melancon - (UFC, Strikeforce, Bellator)
  Gilbert Melendez - (WEC, Strikeforce, UFC, Shooto, PRIDE)
  Fabio Mello - (Shooto, Jungle Fight, Bellator, PRIDE, DEEP, Titan FC, WSOF)
  Chad Mendes - (PFC, TPF, WEC, UFC)
  Alonzo Menifield - (Bellator, LFA, UFC)
  Ivan Menjivar - (UFC, IFL, KOTC, K-1 Hero's, MFC)
  Dave Menne - (Shooto, RINGS, UFC, DEEP, Cage Rage, Bellator)
  Ray Mercer - (Adrenaline MMA)
  Yaotzin Meza - (UFC)
  Guy Mezger - (Pancrase, PRIDE, KOTC, UFC)
  David Michaud - (UFC)
  Thiago Michel - (Bellator)
  Taka Michinoku - (Pancrase)
  Zach Micklewright - (WEC)
  Bojan Mihajlović - (UFC)
  Pawel "Popek" Mikołajuw - (KSW)
  Pat Miletich - (Adrenaline MMA, IFL, RINGS, UFC)
  Cole Miller - (UFC, Shooto)
  Dan Miller - (UFC, IFL)
  Henry "Sentoryu Henri" Miller - (Cage Rage, PRIDE, Pancrase, DEEP)
  Jason "Mayhem" Miller - (UFC, Strikeforce, DREAM, WFA, WEC)
  Jim Miller - (UFC, IFL)
  Micah Miller - (WEC, DREAM, XFC, TPF, KOTC, Titan FC)
  Che Mills - (BAMMA, Cage Rage, M-1, UFC, CWFC)
  Adam Milstead - (UFC, KOTC)
  Vitaly Minakov - (M-1, Bellator)
  Ikuhisa Minowa - (DREAM, K-1 Hero's, Pancrase, PRIDE, DEEP, SFL)
  Stipe Miocic - (UFC)
  Frank Mir - (UFC)
  Mario Miranda - (UFC, M-1, KSW)
  Vitor Miranda - (Shooto, K-1, UFC)
  Rasul Mirzaev
  Kazuo Misaki - (PRIDE, Sengoku, Pancrase, DEEP, Strikeforce)
  Dokonjonosuke Mishima - (Shooto, PRIDE, UFC, DEEP)
  David Mitchell - (UFC, TPF)
  Matt Mitrione - (UFC, Bellator)
  Eiji Mitsuoka - (KOTC, PRIDE, DEEP, Shooto, Sengoku, DREAM, UFC)
  Hiromitsu Miura - (Pancrase, K-1 Hero's, WEC, DEEP)
  Takeshi Miyanaga - (Shooto)
  Kazuyuki Miyata - (DREAM, K-1, K-1 Hero's, DEEP, RINGS)
  Takeya Mizugaki - (Shooto, WEC, UFC, ACB)
  Eiji Mizuno - (Shooto)
  Tatsuya Mizuno - (K-1, Pancrase, M-1, DREAM, OneFC)
  Steve Mocco - (WSOF)
  Nate Mohr - (UFC, KOTC)
  Ashkan Mokhtarian - (UFC)
  Hidetaka Monma - (RINGS, Pancrase, DEEP, K-1 Hero's, DREAM)
  Jeff Monson - (UFC, Strikeforce, PRIDE, DREAM, M-1, Sengoku, CWFC)
  Darrell Montague - (VTJ, TPF, UFC)
  Augusto Montaño - (UFC, Jungle Fight)
  James Moontasri - (UFC)
  Homer Moore - (IFL, WEC, UFC)
  Nate Moore - (Strikeforce)
  Marlon Moraes - (WSOF, XFC)
  Sergio Moraes - (Jungle Fight, Bellator, UFC)
  John Moraga - (UFC)
  Ricardo Morais - (RINGS, PRIDE, Jungle Fight)
  Omar Morales - (UFC)
  Vince Morales - (UFC, Bellator, KOTC)
  Christian Morecraft - (UFC)
  Joe Moreira - (UFC)
  Brandon Moreno - (UFC)
  Sammy Morgan - (UFC, Shooto, Strikeforce, ShoXC, KOTC)
  Remigijus Morkevicius - (Shooto, K-1 Hero's)
  Johnnie Morton - (K-1 Hero's)
  Robson Moura - (Shooto)
  Gegard Mousasi - (Strikeforce, DREAM, DEEP, MFC, Pride, K-1, CWFC, UFC, Bellator)
  Christian M'Pumbu - (Bellator, DEEP, KSW, M-1)
  Mike Mucitelli - (Bellator)
  Quinn Mulhern - (UFC, KOTC, Strikeforce)
  Pedro Munhoz - (UFC)
  Mark Muñoz - (PFC, WEC, UFC)
  Andy Murad - (Bellator, KOTC)
  Kazunari Murakami - (Pride, Jungle Fight)
  Ryuichi Murata - (DEEP, Pride)
  Shinya Murofushi - (Shooto)
  Lee Murray - (Cage Rage, UFC)
  Nico Musoke - (UFC)
  Elvis Mutapčić - (UFC, MFC, ACB, WSOF, SF)

N
  Katsuhiko Nagata - (K-1, K-1 Hero's, Pancrase, DREAM)
  Yuji Nagata
  Yoshitaka Naito (Shooto, ONE) 
  Andrews Nakahara - (K-1, DREAM)
  Yuki Nakai - (VTJ, Shooto)
  Daisuke Nakamura - (PRIDE, Strikeforce, M-1, Cage Rage, DREAM, DEEP, K-1 Hero's)
  Hiroshi Nakamura - (Bellator, DEEP, Shooto)
  Kazuhiro Nakamura - (PRIDE, UFC, Sengoku, DREAM, DEEP)
  Keita Nakamura - (Shooto, UFC, DREAM, Sengoku, VTJ, DEEP)
  Shinsuke Nakamura - (K-1, Jungle Fight)
  Jutaro Nakao - (DEEP, PRIDE, UFC, Shooto)
  Yoshihiro "Kiss" Nakao - (K-1, K-1 Hero's, PRIDE, Sengoku)
  Takumi Nakayama - (Shooto, KOTC, DEEP, Pancrase, VTJ)
  Tyson Nam - (EliteXC, Shooto, KOTC, Bellator, WSOF)
  Yui Chul Nam - (UFC, M-1)
  Yasuhito Namekawa - (PRIDE, RINGS, DEEP)
  Yodsanan Sor Nanthachai - (OneFC)
  Jadamba Narantungalag - (Sengoku, K-1, AOW, OneFC)
  Antz Nansen - (Sengoku)
  Tomasz Narkun - (M-1, KSW)
  Masayuki Naruse - (Pancrase, Jungle Fight, K-1, RINGS)
  Roger Narvaez - (UFC)
  Tenshin Nasukawa ( Rizin)
  Pawel Nastula - (PRIDE, KSW, Sengoku)
  Rafael Natal - (UFC)
  Marcio Navarro - (Bellator, Titan FC, KOTC)
  Renê Nazare - (Bellator)
  Dustin Neace - (UFC, Bellator, Strikeforce)
  Stanislav Nedkov - (Shooto, Pancrase, Sengoku, UFC)
  Josh Neer - (UFC, Bellator, IFL)
  Steve Nelmark - (UFC)
  Gunnar Nelson - (UFC, BAMMA, Cage Contender)
  Roy Nelson - (IFL, EliteXC, UFC)
  Shane Nelson - (UFC, Shooto, MFC)
  Viktor Nemkov - (M-1)
  Antonio Braga Neto - (UFC, Sengoku, AOW)
  Nick Newell - (XFC, WSOF)
  Carlos Newton - (VTJ, Shooto, PRIDE, UFC, IFL, K-1 Hero's)
  Emanuel Newton - (Bellator, MFC, IFL, KOTC, WEC)
  Alain Ngalani - (OneFC)
  Francis Ngannou - (UFC)
  Ben Nguyen - (UFC)
  Alex Nicholson - (UFC, Legacy)
  Matheus Nicolau - (UFC, Shooto)
  Tom Niinimäki - (Shooto, CWFC, Titan FC, UFC)
  Ramsey Nijem - (UFC)
  Hans Nijman - (RINGS, PRIDE)
  Mats Nilsson - (Shooto, CWFC, UFC)
  Jack Nilson - (RINGS, UFC)
  Guangyou Ning - (UFC, AOW)
  Yosuke Nishijima - (PRIDE, K-1)
  Akiyo Nishiura - (DEEP, Shooto, DREAM, VTJ)
  Takashi Nishizawa - (Shooto)
  Anthony Njokuani - (WEC, UFC)
  Jacob Noe - (Bellator, Strikeforce)
  Alexandre Franca Nogueira - (K-1 Hero's, Shooto, WEC, VTJ)
  Antônio Rodrigo "Minotauro" Nogueira - (UFC, PRIDE, RINGS)
  Antônio Rogério "Minotouro" Nogueira - (PRIDE, Affliction, Jungle Fight, Sengoku, DEEP, UFC)
  Luis Nogueira - (Shooto, Bellator)
  Kyle Noke - (UFC, EliteXC)
  Kimihito Nonaka - (Shooto)
  K. J. Noons - (EliteXC, ShoXC, DREAM, Strikeforce, UFC)
  Sage Northcutt - (Legacy, UFC)
  Jan Nortje - (K-1, K-1 Hero's, PRIDE, DREAM, Strikeforce)
  Phillipe Nover - (Combat Zone, UFC, Bellator)
  Diego Nunes - (UFC, WEC, Shooto, Bellator)
  Khabib Nurmagomedov - (UFC, M-1)

O
  Jake O'Brien - (UFC, DREAM, WEC)
  Sean O'Connell - (MFC, UFC)
  Volkan Oezdemir - (Bellator, UFC, Shooto)
  Haruo Ochi - (Shooto, DEEP, Rizin)
  Naoya Ogawa - (PRIDE)
  Andy Ogle - (UFC)
  Carl Ognibene - (PRIDE)
  Tomonori Ohara - (Shooto)
  Kenji Ogusu - (Shooto)
  Sean O'Haire - (K-1, K-1 Hero's, PRIDE)
  Michiyoshi Ohara - (PRIDE)
  Masahiro Oishi - (DEEP, Pancrase, Shooto)
  Takayuki "Giant Ochiai" Okada - (PRIDE, KOTC, DEEP)
  Yushin Okami - (K-1 Hero's, Pancrase, M-1, PRIDE, UFC, WSOF)
  Koetsu Okazaki - (Shooto, OneFC)
  Mamoru Okochi - (Shooto)
  Yasunori Okuda - (Shooto)
  Taisuke Okuno - (Shooto, Sengoku, DEEP)
  Alexey Oleinik - (M-1, KSW, Bellator, UFC, YAMMA)
  Charles Oliveira - (UFC, Jungle Fight)
  Rafaello Oliveira - (UFC, ShoXC, XFC)
  Bobby Ologun - (K-1, K-1 Hero's)
  Andy Ologun - (K-1, K-1 Hero's, DREAM)
  Brian Olsen - (WEC)
  Casey Olson - (WEC, PFC, Strikeforce, TPF)
  Sean O'Malley - (UFC, LFA)
  Daniel Omielańczuk - (UFC, KSW)
  Michihiro Omigawa - (Cage Rage, DEEP, PRIDE, Shooto, Sengoku, UFC, DREAM)
  Chuck O'Neil - (UFC, Bellator)
  Masaya Onodera - (Shooto)
  Sam Oropeza - (Bellator, Strikeforce)
  Brian Ortega - (UFC)
  Dustin Ortiz - (UFC, Strikeforce, TPF, KOTC)
  Jorge Ortiz - (Bellator, Strikeforce, Shooto, KOTC)
  Tito Ortiz - (UFC, Bellator)
  Kenji Osawa - (DREAM, WEC, Shooto, VTJ)
  Shigeki Osawa - (Sengoku, RINGS, Shooto, Pancrase, VTJ)
  Nick Osipczak - (UFC)
  Alexander Otsuka - (KOTC, PRIDE, RINGS)
  Isamu Osugi - (Shooto)
  Zak Ottow - (UFC, RFA, KOTC)
  Hiromasa Ougikubo - (Shooto)
  Alistair Overeem - (K-1, K-1 Hero's, RINGS, PRIDE, Strikeforce, DREAM, UFC)
  Valentijn Overeem - (K-1, K-1 Hero's, M-1, KSW, RINGS, PRIDE, Pancrase, WFA, Sengoku, Strikeforce)
  Shungo Oyama - (K-1 Hero's, KOTC, PRIDE, Pancrase, DREAM, RINGS)
  Alptekin Özkiliç - (UFC)

P
  Nick Pace - (UFC, WEC, Bellator)
  Joe Pacheco - (Bellator)
  Damacio Page - (UFC, WEC, K-1 Hero's, Pancrase, KOTC)
  Michael Page - (Bellator, SFL)
  Dustin Pague - (UFC)
  Fredson Paixão - (Jungle Fight, Pancrase, DEEP, WEC, UFC)
  Teemu Packalen - (UFC)
  Bart Palaszewski - (IFL, Adrenaline MMA, KOTC, Shooto, WEC, UFC)
  Soa Palelei - (UFC, KOTC, PRIDE, Shooto)
  Rousimar Palhares - (UFC, WSOF)
  Luis Palomino - (XFC, Bellator, WSOF)
  Alexandre Pantoja - (UFC, RFA, Shooto)
  Norman Paraisy - (CWFC, Bellator, M-1)
  Remco Pardoel - (RINGS, Pancrase, Shooto, UFC)
  Ido Pariente - (K-1 Hero's)
  Karo Parisyan - (KOTC, UFC, WEC, Bellator)
  Norman Parke - (UFC)
  Mikkel Parlo - (Bellator)
  Jorge Patino - (PRIDE, UFC, Jungle Fight, Strikeforce, WSOF)
  Alan Patrick - (Jungle Fight, UFC)
  Claude Patrick - (UFC, IFL, KOTC)
  Erik Paulson - (VTJ, Shooto)
  Estevan Payan - (UFC, Strikeforce, Bellator)
  Ross Pearson - (UFC, CWFC)
  André Pederneiras - (UFC, VTJ)
  Tyson Pedro - (UFC)
  Willie Peeters - (Pride, RINGS)
  Eric Pele - (RINGS, KOTC, MFC)
  Kurt Pellegrino - (UFC, WEC, Bellator, Pancrase)
  Cathal Pendred - (CWFC, UFC)
  B.J. Penn - (K-1, K-1 Hero's, UFC)
  Godofredo Pepey - (UFC)
  Robbie Peralta - (UFC, Strikeforce)
  Alejandro Pérez - (UFC)
  Alex Perez - (UFC, KOTC, TPF)
  Érik Pérez - (WEC, UFC, BAMMA)
  Markus Perez - (UFC, LFA, Jungle Fight)
  Anthony Perosh - (UFC, Shooto)
  Thiago Perpétuo - (UFC, Jungle Fight)
  Viktor Pešta - (UFC)
  Seth Petruzelli - (KOTC, UFC, EliteXC, WEC, BAMMA, Bellator)
  Anthony Pettis - (WEC, UFC)
  Sergio Pettis - (RFA, UFC)
  Forrest Petz - (UFC, KOTC, Adrenaline MMA)
  Nam Phan - (K-1 Hero's, KOTC, Strikeforce, Sengoku, WEC, UFC, TPF)
  Costas Philippou - (UFC)
  Adam Piccolotti - (Bellator)
  Vinc Pichel - (UFC)
  Brad Pickett - (Cage Rage, K-1 Hero's, WEC, UFC)
  Oskar Piechota - (UFC, CWFC)
  Mike Pierce - (WEC, UFC)
  Sean Pierson - (UFC)
  Daniel Pineda - (UFC, Bellator, EliteXC)
  Craig Pittman - (VTJ)
  Mike Plotcheck - (PRIDE)
  Dustin Poirier - (WEC, UFC)
  Igor Pokrajac - (UFC, Jungle Fight, K-1, KSW)
  John Polakowski - (UFC, WEC)
  Mike Polchlopek
  Marco Polo Reyes - (UFC)
  Callan Potter - (UFC)
  Ruan Potts - (UFC)
  Wagner Prado - (UFC, KSW)
  Trevor Prangley - (MFC, Strikeforce, UFC, KOTC, Bellator, DREAM, SFL)
  Carlo Prater - (MFC, PFC, VTJ, WEC, UFC)
  Michel Prazeres - (UFC, Jungle Fight, Shooto)
  Brent Primus - (Bellator)
  Eric Prindle - (Bellator)
  Joe Proctor - (UFC)
  Bruno Pucci - (OneFC)
  Daniel Puder - (Strikeforce)
  Mariusz Pudzianowski - (KSW)
  Jens Pulver - (IFL, PRIDE, Shooto, UFC, WEC, OneFC, Titan FC)
  CM Punk - (UFC)
  Mike Pyle - (EliteXC, IFL, Strikeforce, Affliction, MFC, Shooto, WEC, UFC)

Q
  Bao Quach - (Strikeforce, ShoXC, WEC, KOTC, Shooto, Affliction, Bellator, M-1)
  Nathan Quarry - (KOTC, UFC)
  Vinicius Queiroz - (UFC, Bellator)
  Dan Quinn
  José Alberto Quiñónez - (UFC)

R
  Benji Radach - (UFC, Strikeforce, IFL, WEC, KOTC, EliteXC, MFC, Bellator)
  Jordan Radev - (UFC, BAMMA, M-1, RINGS, KSW)
  Ricky Rainey - (XFC, Bellator)
  Luis Ramos - (Shooto, DEEP, UFC)
  Ricardo Ramos - (LFA, UFC)
  Kevin Randleman (†) - (PRIDE, UFC, Sengoku, Strikeforce)
  Ed Ratcliff - (WEC)
  Gideon Ray - (UFC, IFL, KOTC)
  Levan Razmadze - (DEEP)
  Rafael Rebello - (WEC)
  J. P. Reese - (Bellator, XFC)
  Alex Reid - (Pancrase, Cage Rage, BAMMA)
  Chad Reiner - (UFC, KOTC, Adrenaline MMA, Bellator)
  Jason Reinhardt - (UFC, KOTC)
  Wilson Reis - (Bellator, ShoXC, CWFC, UFC)
  Goran Reljić - (UFC, KSW)
  Dominick Reyes - (UFC, LFC, KOTC)
  Yahir Reyes - (Bellator)
  Gastón Reyno - (Bellator)
  Eric Reynolds - (Bellator, XFC)
  Alexandre Ribeiro - (Sengoku)
  Saulo Ribeiro
  Vítor Ribeiro - (WFA, Shooto, Cage Rage, K-1 Hero's, DREAM, Strikeforce)
  Will Ribeiro - (WEC, Shooto)
  Mike Ricci - (Bellator, UFC, Titan FC)
  Matt Ricehouse - (Strikeforce)
  Mike Richman - (Bellator)
  David Rickels - (Bellator)
  Matt Riddle - (Bellator, UFC, Titan FC)
  Jeremiah Riggs - (Bellator, Strikeforce)
  Joe Riggs - (K-1, UFC, WEC, Strikeforce, BFC)
  Aaron Riley - (UFC, PRIDE, IFL, Shooto)
  Nick Ring - (Bellator, DEEP, UFC)
  Mike Rio - (UFC)
  Shannon Ritch - (PRIDE, WEC, MFC, KOTC, Pancrase, MFC)
  Dante Rivera - (UFC, Bellator, IFL)
  Francisco Rivera - (UFC, WEC, TPF)
  Jimmie Rivera - (KOTC, Bellator, WSOF, Cage Rage)
  Jorge Rivera - (UFC, Cage Rage, CWFC, UFC)
  Pedro Rizzo - (PRIDE, UFC, Affliction, M-1)
  Karl Roberson - (UFC)
  Andre Roberts - (UFC, WEC)
  Daniel Roberts - (UFC, Titan FC)
  Danny Roberts - (CWFC, UFC)
  Kenny Robertson - (UFC, Bellator, Cage Rage)
  Alvin Robinson - (UFC, Bellator, Titan FC)
  Carlos Eduardo Rocha - (UFC)
  Vagner Rocha - (Bellator, Strikeforce, UFC)
  Luke Rockhold - (Strikeforce, UFC)
  Jose "Dos Caras, Jr." Rodríguez - (DEEP, PRIDE)
  Ricco Rodriguez - (KOTC, PRIDE, UFC, WEC, WFA, IFL, EliteXC, BAMMA, Bellator, YAMMA)
  Yair Rodríguez - (UFC)
  Marcos Rogério de Lima - (UFC, Strikeforce, Shooto)
  Brett Rogers - (Bellator, Strikeforce, EliteXC, Titan FC)
  Brian Rogers - (Bellator, Strikeforce)
  Shane Roller - (WEC, UFC)
  Ricardo Romero - (UFC)
  Yoel Romero - (UFC, Strikeforce)
  Jesse Ronson - (UFC)
  George Roop - (WEC, UFC)
  Rene Rooze - (K-1, VTJ)
  João Roque - (DEEP, Shooto, VTJ, UFC, WFA)
  Aaron Rosa - (UFC, ShoXC, Adrenaline MMA, Strikeforce, Bellator, Titan FC)
  Charles Rosa - (UFC)
  Jake Rosholt - (UFC, WEC, Bellator, Titan FC)
  Jared Rosholt - (UFC, Titan FC, WSOF)
  Kevin Rosier - (UFC)
  Ben Rothwell - (M-1, KOTC, IFL, Adrenaline MMA, Affliction, UFC)
  Rick Roufus - (Strikeforce)
  Khalil Rountree Jr. - (UFC, RFA)
  Chad "Akebono" Rowan - (K-1 Hero's)
  Jairzinho Rozenstruik - (UFC)
  Mauricio "Shogun" Rua - (PRIDE, UFC)
  Murilo "Ninja" Rua - (Cage Rage, EliteXC, Strikeforce, PRIDE, DREAM, BAMMA, Shooto)
  Marco Ruas - (IFL, PRIDE, UFC)
  Gabe Ruediger - (WEC, UFC, PFC)
  Anthony Ruiz - (KOTC, WEC, EliteXC, Strikeforce, ShoXC, PFC, TPF)
  Mike Russow - (UFC, PRIDE, Adrenaline MMA)
  Ed Ruth - (Bellator)
  Bas Rutten - (Pancrase, UFC, WFA)

S
  Amir Sadollah - (UFC)
  Frankie Saenz - (KOTC, UFC)
  Saparbek Safarov - (UFC, M-1)
  Tarec Saffiedine - (Shooto, DREAM, Strikeforce, UFC)
  Tomoyuki Saito - (Shooto)
  Yukio Sakaguchi - (Pancrase, Shooto, DREAM, Sengoku)
  Augusto Sakai - (UFC, Bellator)
  Kazuhiro Sakamoto - (Shooto)
  Mitsuhiro Sakamoto - (Shooto)
  Alessio Sakara - (CWFC, MFC, Jungle Fight, UFC, Bellator)
  Wataru Sakata - (PRIDE, RINGS)
  Gokhan Saki - (UFC)
  Kazushi "Gracie Hunter" Sakuraba - (K-1 Hero's, PRIDE, UFC, DREAM)
  Naoki Sakurada - (Shooto, VTJ)
  Hayato Sakurai - (VTJ, DEEP, PRIDE, Shooto, UFC, DREAM)
  Justin Salas - (UFC)
  Ivan Salaverry - (K-1, Shooto, UFC, WFA, BAMMA)
  Marcello Salazar - (IFL)
  Sean Salmon - (UFC, Strikeforce, KOTC)
  John Salter - (UFC, XFC, Adrenaline MMA, KOTC)
  Zabit Samedov
  Josh Samman - (UFC, XFC)
  Josh Sampo - (UFC)
  Andrew Sanchez - (UFC, RFA)
  Angelo Sanchez - (KOTC, Bellator)
  Diego Sanchez - (KOTC, UFC)
  Eddie Sanchez - (KOTC, UFC, Bellator, Titan FC)
  Joby Sanchez - (UFC, TPF, XFC, KOTC)
  Roberto Sanchez - (UFC, LFA, LFC)
  Hector Sandoval - (UFC, TPF)
  Marlon Sandro - (Bellator, Sengoku, Pancrase, Shooto)
  Naoki Sano - (Pancrase, PRIDE)
  Giva Santana - (Bellator, ShoXC, TPF)
  Jorge Santiago - (UFC, Strikeforce, Sengoku, KOTC, Titan FC, WSOF)
  Bruno Santos - (Bellator, UFC)
  Evangelista Santos - (Strikeforce, Sengoku, PRIDE, Cage Rage, Jungle Fight, Pancrase)
  Iliarde Santos - (UFC, Jungle Fight)
  Leonardo Santos - (Shooto, Sengoku, CWFC, BAMMA, UFC)
  Luis Santos - (WEC, Bellator, XFC)
  Thiago Santos - (UFC)
  Thiago Santos - (Bellator)
  Bob Sapp - (K-1, K-1 Hero's, PRIDE, DREAM, SFL, OneFC, KSW)
  Daniel Sarafian - (Bellator, UFC)
  Diego Saraiva - (UFC, Bellator, PFC, TPF)
  Alexander Sarnavskiy - (Bellator, M-1)
  Yuki Sasaki - (PRIDE, Sengoku, Pancrase, UFC, Shooto, DEEP)
  Yuta Sasaki - (Shooto, VTJ, DEEP, UFC)
  Malaipet Sasiprapa - (KOTC, ShoXC)
  Paul Sass - (Bellator, UFC)
  Masaaki Satake - (PRIDE)
  Rumina Sato - (Shooto, VTJ)
  Takenori Sato - (Sengoku, DEEP, Pancrase, K-1 Hero's, UFC)
  Ben Saunders - (UFC, Titan FC, Bellator)
  Townsend Saunders - (UFC)
  Irshaad Sayed - (OneFC)
  Lumumba Sayers - (Strikeforce)
  Matt Sayles - (UFC)
  Ian Schaffa - (Shooto, K-1, K-1 Hero's, Sengoku)
  Eric Schafer - (UFC)
  Kerry Schall - (RINGS, UFC, Adrenaline MMA, ShoXC)
  Eric Schambari - (WEC, Bellator)
  Brendan Schaub - (UFC)
  Nino Schembri - (PRIDE, Cage Rage)
  Fabiano Scherner - (Jungle Fight, UFC, Cage Rage, IFL)
  Joe Schilling - (ShoXC, Bellator)
  Semmy Schilt - (Pancrase, RINGS, UFC, PRIDE, K-1 Hero's)
  Adam Schindler - (Bellator, Strikeforce)
  Matt Schnell - (LFC, UFC)
  Bob Schrijber - (RINGS, PRIDE, M-1)
  Mark Schultz - (UFC, Jungle Fight)
  Ryan Schultz - (WEC, IFL, Sengoku)
  Justin Scoggins - (UFC)
  Brad Scott - (UFC)
  Neil Seery - (UFC, Cage Rage, CWFC, BAMMA)
  Ray Sefo - (K-1 Hero's, Strikeforce, WSOF)
  Rony Sefo - (PRIDE)
  Yasuto Sekishima - (Shooto)
  Pete Sell - (UFC)
  Andrei Semenov - (M-1, PRIDE, UFC)
  Mackens Semerzier - (UFC, WEC)
  Alex Serdyukov - (WEC)
  Matt Serra - (UFC)
  Fredy Serrano - (UFC)
  Dan "The Beast" Severn - (KOTC, VTJ, PRIDE, UFC, WEC, MFC)
  Kamal Shalorus - (UFC, WEC, OneFC)
  Shahbulat Shamhalaev - (Bellator, M-1)
  Frank Shamrock - (K-1, Pancrase, VTJ, Strikeforce, UFC, WEC)
  Ken Shamrock - (Pancrase, PRIDE, UFC, KOTC)
  Eric Shelton - (UFC, RFA)
  Sean Sherk - (KOTC, PRIDE, UFC)
  Chase Sherman - (UFC, Titan FC)
  Katsuyori Shibata - (K-1, DEEP, DREAM, K-1 Hero's, Jungle Fight)
  Jake Shields - (EliteXC, Pancrase, Shooto, K-1 Hero's, Strikeforce, UFC, WSOF)
  Suguru Shigeno - (Shooto)
  Kiyotaka Shimizu - (Shooto, Pancrase, DEEP)
  Yuya Shirai - (DEEP, DREAM, BAMMA, Pancrase, OneFC, M-1)
  Wes Shivers - (KOTC, Strikeforce, ShoXC)
  Alexander Shlemenko - (Bellator, SFL, ShoXC, Jungle Fight, M-1)
  Josh Shockley - (UFC, Bellator)
  Akira Shoji - (Cage Rage, DEEP, KOTC, Pancrase, PRIDE)
  Yuki Shoujou - (Shooto)
  Sam Sicilia - (UFC, Bellator)
  Kirill Sidelnikov - (Affliction, M-1)
  Steven Siler - (UFC, TPF)
  Siala-Mou "Mighty Mo" Siliga - (K-1 Hero's, Bellator)
  Anderson "The Spider" Silva - (Cage Rage, PRIDE, Shooto, UFC)
  Antônio "Bigfoot" Silva - (K-1 Hero's, EliteXC, CWFC, Sengoku, Strikeforce, UFC)
  Assuerio Silva - (Pancrase, Jungle Fight, UFC, PRIDE)
  Cláudio Silva - (BAMMA, SFL, UFC)
  Erick Silva - (Jungle Fight, UFC)
  Jay Silva - (UFC, KSW, Bellator, MFC, TPF)
  Joaquim Silva - (UFC)
  Paulo "Giant" Silva - (K-1 Hero's, PRIDE)
  Rafael Silva - (Bellator)
  Thiago Silva - (Pancrase, Shooto, UFC, WSOF)
  Wanderlei "The Axe Murderer" Silva - (PRIDE, UFC)
  Elias Silvério - (UFC, Jungle Fight)
  Aaron Simpson - (UFC, WEC, WSOF)
  Heath Sims - (Pancrase)
  Wes Sims - (K-1, IFL, Strikeforce, WEC, UFC)
  Lodune Sincaid - (WEC, UFC, WFA, PFC)
  Rory Singer - (PRIDE, KOTC, UFC, MFC)
  Elvis Sinosic - (Cage Rage, Pancrase, UFC, K-1, RINGS)
  Dennis Siver - (UFC, CWFC)
  Chas Skelly - (UFC, Bellator)
  Matt Skelton - (PRIDE)
  Shanon Slack - (Bellator)
  Ray Sloan - (Bellator)
  Paul Slowinski - (KSW)
  Kestutis Smirnovas - (RINGS, PRIDE, Shooto, K-1, K-1 Hero's)
  Anthony Smith - (Strikeforce, UFC, Bellator)
  Colton Smith - (M-1, UFC)
  David Smith - (Strikeforce)
  Jordan Smith - (Bellator)
  Maurice "Mo" Smith - (IFL, Pancrase, PRIDE, UFC, Sengoku, Strikeforce, RINGS)
  Patrick Smith - (K-1, UFC, Titan FC, YAMMA)
  Scott Smith - (Strikeforce, EliteXC, PFC, UFC, WEC)
  Trevor Smith - (Strikeforce, UFC)
  Louis Smolka - (UFC, KOTC)
  André Soares - (Shooto, CWFC, EliteXC)
  Peter Sobotta - (UFC, KSW)
  Renato Sobral - (RINGS, UFC, Jungle Fight, Cage Rage, Affliction, Strikeforce, OneFC, Bellator)
  Rameau Thierry Sokoudjou - (PRIDE, WEC, UFC, DREAM, Affliction, Strikeforce, MFC, KSW, Bellator)
  Roberto Soldić - (Final Fight, Cage Warriors, KSW)
  Rambaa Somdet - (Shooto, DEEP, PFC)
  Joe Son - (PRIDE, UFC)
  Chael Sonnen - (Pancrase, WEC, UFC)
  Sean Soriano - (UFC)
  Chandet Sorpantrey - (K-1)
  Krzysztof Soszynski - (IFL, Strikeforce, UFC)
  George Sotiropoulos - (K-1, Shooto, UFC, Titan FC)
  Greg Soto - (UFC)
  Joe Soto - (Bellator, PFC, TPF, UFC)
  Bobby Southworth - (Strikeforce, UFC, PRIDE)
  Cristiano Souza - (Bellator)
  Kevin Souza - (UFC, Jungle Fight)
  Ronaldo Souza - (UFC, Strikeforce, DREAM, Jungle Fight)
  Andreas Spång - (Bellator, MFC, Strikeforce)
  Chris Spång - (Strikeforce, UFC)
  Ron Sparks - (Bellator)
  Tom Speer - (WEC, UFC)
  Sean Spencer - (UFC, Bellator)
  Mario Sperry - (Cage Rage, PRIDE)
  Eric Spicely - (UFC)
  Ben Spijkers - (Shooto)
  Waachiim Spiritwolf - (Bellator, Strikeforce, KOTC, TPF)
  Daniel Spitz - (UFC, KOTC)
  Dan Spohn - (Bellator, UFC)
  Tyrone Spong - (WSOF)
  Jeremy Spoon - (Bellator, KOTC)
  Pete Spratt - (MFC, Strikeforce, UFC)
  Ron Stallings - (Strikeforce, UFC)
  Brian Stann -  (WEC, UFC)
  Josh Stansbury - (UFC, Bellator)
  Martin Stapleton - (Bellator, Cage Rage)
  Clifford Starks - (UFC, Bellator, WSOF)
  Kalib Starnes - (UFC, WSOF, Titan FC)
  Steve Steinbeiss - (WEC, UFC, Bellator)
  Akop Stepanyan - (Bellator, M-1)
  Jeremy Stephens - (UFC)
  Aljamain Sterling - (UFC)
  Joe Stevenson - (KOTC, UFC)
  Trevor Stewardson - (KOTC)
  Darren Stewart - (UFC, CWFC)
  Luke Stewart - (Strikeforce)
  Alex Stiebling - (WEC, Pancrase, PRIDE, UFC, WFA)
  Tyler Stinson - (Strikeforce, Bellator, WSOF, Titan FC)
  Ken Stone - (UFC, WEC)
  Rick Story - (UFC)
  Sam Stout - (UFC)
  Georges St-Pierre - (UFC)
  Ovince St. Preux - (XFC, Strikeforce, UFC)
  Dave Strasser - (UFC, M-1, Cage Rage, Shooto)
  Daniel Mason-Straus - (Bellator)
  Gerald Strebendt - (PRIDE, KOTC, UFC, Cage Rage, CWFC)
  Sean Strickland - (KOTC, UFC)
  Hans Stringer - (UFC, WSOF, Shooto)
  Stefan Struve - (UFC, M-1)
  Masanori Suda - (DEEP, Pride, Shooto)
  Genki Sudo - (K-1, K-1 Hero's, RINGS, Pancrase, UFC)
  Takashi Sugiura - (Pancrase, PRIDE)
  George Sullivan - (UFC)
  Amar Suloev - (M-1, Pancrase, PRIDE FC, UFC)
  Mitsuhisa Sunabe - (Pancrase, DEEP)
  Jason Suttie - (PRIDE)
  Masato Suzuki - (Shooto)
  Minoru Suzuki - (DEEP, Pancrase)
  Nobutatsu Suzuki - (VTJ, OneFC)
  Shinichi "Wakakirin Shinichi" Suzukawa
  Cub Swanson - (UFC, WEC, KOTC)
  Mike Swick - (UFC, WEC)
  Tim Sylvia - (UFC, Affliction, Adrenaline MMA, OneFC, Titan FC)

T
  Noboru Tahara - (Shooto, Pancrase)
  Joe Taimanglo - (Bellator)
  Mairbek Taisumov - (M-1, UFC)
  Jesse Taitano - (Shooto, VTJ)
  Nobuhiko Takada - (PRIDE)
  Kazuo Takahashi - (Pancrase, Sengoku, PRIDE, UFC, K-1 Hero's)
  Daiju Takase - (DEEP, Pancrase, Adrenaline MMA, PRIDE, UFC)
  Hiroyuki Takaya - (Shooto, K-1 Hero's, WEC, DREAM, Strikeforce, VTJ)
  Yoshihiro Takayama - (PRIDE)
  Yoshiyuki Takayama - (Shooto)
  Izuru Takeuchi - (Sengoku, Shooto, Pancrase, K-1 Hero's)
  Makoto Takimoto - (Sengoku, PRIDE)
  Oleg Taktarov - (Pancrase, PRIDE, UFC, YAMMA)
  Nordine Taleb - (Bellator, UFC)
  Akitoshi Tamura - (Shooto, WEC, Sengoku, Pancrase)
  Issei Tamura - (UFC, Shooto)
  Kiyoshi Tamura - (DREAM, DEEP, K-1, K-1 Hero's, PRIDE, RINGS)
  Jason Tan - (UFC)
  Kenichi Tanaka - (Shooto)
  Michinori Tanaka - (Shooto, UFC)
  Tomohiro Tanaka - (Shooto)
  Evan Tanner - (Pancrase, UFC)
  Manny Tapia - (KOTC, WEC, TPF)
  Yuzo Tateishi - (Shooto)
  Uchu Tatsumi - (Shooto)
  Deividas Taurosevicius - (IFL, WEC, Bellator)
  Brad Tavares - (UFC)
  Thiago Tavares - (UFC, CWFC)
  Jesse Taylor - (WSOF, Strikeforce, MFC, CWFC, DREAM, KSW, UFC)
  Louis Taylor - (Adrenaline MMA, Strikeforce, Bellator, UFC)
  Paul Taylor - (UFC, Cage Rage)
  James Te Huna - (UFC, KOTC)
  Glover Teixeira - (WEC, PFC, Impact Fighting Championship, Shooto, UFC)
  John Teixeira - (UFC, Shooto, Bellator)
  Tra Telligman - (Pancrase, PRIDE, UFC)
  Sylvester Terkay - (K-1, K-1 Hero's)
  Herman Terrado - (Bellator, Strikeforce)
  David Terrell - (UFC, Pancrase)
  James Terry - (Strikeforce, Bellator)
  Dragan Tešanović - (Bellator)
  Brandon Thatch - (UFC, Strikeforce)
  Elias Theodorou - (UFC, Bellator)
  Paulo Thiago - (UFC, Jungle Fight)
  James Thompson - (Cage Rage, PRIDE, SFL, KSW, Sengoku, EliteXC, DREAM, Bellator)
  Nick Thompson - (UFC, EliteXC, Strikeforce, Bellator, Sengoku, MFC)
  Oli Thompson - (UFC, KSW, BAMMA)
  Stephen Thompson - (UFC)
  Josh Thomson - (PRIDE, Strikeforce, UFC, WFA)
  Din Thomas - (DEEP, Shooto, UFC)
  Ryan Thomas - (Bellator, UFC, XFC)
  Sander Thonhauser - (RINGS, M-1)
  Simeon Thoresen - (UFC, BAMMA, AOW, DEEP, CWFC)
  Gleison Tibau - (UFC, DEEP)
  Darren Till - (UFC)
  Ricardo Tirloni - (Bellator, MFC)
  Zaza Tkeshelashvili - (RINGS)
  Hideo Tokoro - (Shooto, Pancrase, K-1, K-1 Hero's, RINGS, DREAM, VTJ)
  Kazuki Tokudome - (UFC, Pancrase, KSW, DEEP, Sengoku)
  Takashi Tojo - (Shooto)
  Shawn Tompkins
  Tyler Toner - (UFC, WEC, Strikeforce)
  James Toney - (UFC)
  Georgi Tonkov - (RINGS)
  Miguel Torres - (WEC, UFC, WSOF)
  Justin Torrey - (Bellator)
  Salim Touahri - (UFC)
  Dequan Townsend - (UFC, WXC, XFC, NAAFS)
  Roberto Traven - (UFC, RINGS, Adrenaline MMA)
  Alexander Trevino - (Strikeforce)
  Frank Trigg - (VTJ, PRIDE, Shooto, UFC, WFA)
  Francisco Trinaldo - (Jungle Fight, UFC)
  Tor Troéng - (UFC)
  Abel Trujillo - (UFC)
  Michail Tsarev - (Bellator)
  Chris Tuchscherer - (YAMMA, UFC)
  Jon Tuck - (UFC)
  Jumabieke Tuerxun - (UFC)
  Tai Tuivasa - (UFC)
  Zubaira Tukhugov - (CWFC, UFC)
  Teila Tuli - (UFC)
  Albert Tumenov - (UFC, ACB)
  Gary Turner - (Cage Rage)
  Marcin Tybura - (UFC, M-1)

U
  Masakatsu Ueda - (Shooto, OneFC, Bellator)
  Kyuhei Ueno - (Shooto)
  Ryuki Ueyama - (DEEP, K-1 Hero's, Pancrase, PRIDE, RINGS, AOW)
  Christian Uflacker - (Bellator, Strikeforce)
  Gasan Umalatov - (M-1, UFC)
  Caol Uno - (K-1, K-1 Hero's, Shooto, VTJ, DREAM, UFC)
  Yasuhiro Urushitani - (UFC, Shooto, DEEP, OneFC)
  Alexander Ustinov
  Hayate Usui - (Shooto)
  Darren Uyenoyama - (UFC, Strikeforce, Shooto, DREAM)

V
  Egidijus Valavicius - (RINGS, PRIDE, Shooto, K-1, K-1 Hero's, Bellator)
  Bart Vale - (RINGS)
  Charlie Valencia - (UFC, WEC)
  Isaac Vallie-Flagg - (UFC, Strikeforce, KOTC)
  Mike Van Arsdale - (UFC, WFA)
  Matt Van Buren - (UFC, Bellator)
  Ron van Clief - (UFC)
  Lloyd van Dams - (PRIDE)
  Carey Vanier - (Bellator)
  Paul Varelans - (Pancrase, RINGS, UFC)
  Jamie Varner - (UFC, WEC, XFC, KOTC, Titan FC)
  Vyacheslav Vasilevsky - (Bellator, M-1)
  Linton Vassell - (Bellator, CWFC)
  Javier Vazquez - (UFC, WEC, ShoXC, EliteXC, Shooto, KOTC)
  Matt Veach - (BAMMA, MFC, CWFC, UFC)
  Joe Vedepo - (UFC, Adrenaline MMA, Bellator)
  Attila Vegh - (Bellator, KSW, Shooto)
  Cain Velasquez - (UFC, Strikeforce)
  Bojan Veličković - (RFA, UFC)
  Karlos Vemola - (UFC)
  Jerrel Venetiaan - (RINGS, PRIDE)
  Brandon Vera - (ONE, UFC, WEC)
  Marlon Vera - (UFC)
  Rico Verhoeven
  Renato Verissimo - (UFC, EliteXC)
  Marvin Vettori - (UFC)
  Hugo Viana - (UFC)
  Vitor Vianna - (Bellator)
  James Vick - (UFC)
  David Vieira
  Milton Vieira - (UFC, Strikeforce, DEEP, PRIDE, M-1, Shooto)
  Alexis Vila - (PFC, Bellator, WSOF)
  Gian Villante - (Strikeforce, UFC)
  Joey Villaseñor - (Strikeforce, PRIDE, KOTC, EliteXC, BAMMA, DEEP, WFA)
  Danillo Villefort - (WSOF, Strikeforce, UFC, WEC, IFL, Jungle Fight)
  Yuri Villefort - (UFC, Strikeforce)
  Doug Viney
  Marcos Vinicius - (UFC)
  Brandon Visher - (WEC)
  Falaniko Vitale - (UFC, Strikeforce, Bellator, KOTC, IFL, RINGS)
  Bobby Voelker - (M-1, Titan FC, Strikeforce, UFC)
  Alexander Volkanovski - (UFC, AFC)
  Jacob Volkmann - (Bellator, UFC, WSOF)
  Alexander Volkov - (Bellator, M-1)
  Jason Von Flue - (Strikeforce, WEC, KOTC, UFC)
  Igor Vovchanchyn - (PRIDE)
  Dick Vrij - (RINGS)

W
  Chris Wade - (UFC)
  TJ Waldburger - (UFC)
  Donny Walker - (KOTC, UFC, Bellator)
  Herschel Walker - (Strikeforce)
  Crafton Wallace - (UFC, Strikeforce, KOTC)
  Rodney Wallace - (UFC, M-1, MFC, KSW, Bellator)
  Jim Wallhead - (Bellator, BAMMA, CWFC, UFC)
  Cory Walmsley - (UFC)
  Richard Walsh - (UFC)
  Erik Wanderley
  Curt Warburton - (UFC, BAMMA, CWFC, KSW)
  Brennan Ward - (Bellator)
  Yasushi Warita - (Shooto)
  Joe Warren - (DREAM, Bellator)
  James Warring
  Kazuhisa Watanabe - (K-1)
  Yuichi Watanabe - (Shooto)
  Ron Waterman - (Pancrase, PRIDE, UFC, WEC, WFA, EliteXC)
  Tom Watson - (UFC, BAMMA, MFC)
  Walel Watson - (UFC, Titan FC)
  Royston Wee - (UFC)
  Brent Weedman - (Bellator)
  Daniel Weichel - (Bellator, BAMMA, M-1, CWFC)
  Allan Weickert - (WEC, KOTC, Bellator)
  Chris Weidman - (UFC)
  Mark Weir - (UFC, WEC, Cage Rage, PRIDE, Pancrase)
  Christian Wellisch - (KOTC, Shooto, WEC, UFC)
  Fabrício Werdum - (UFC, Strikeforce, PRIDE, Jungle Fight)
  Cassio Werneck - (WEC)
  Mike Wessel - (Bellator, UFC)
  Ed West - (WSOF, Bellator, IFL)
  Michael Westbrook - (KOTC)
  Sheldon Westcott - (MFC, UFC)
  Coty Wheeler - (WEC, KOTC)
  Alex White - (UFC, Titan FC)
  Vernon White - (Strikeforce, PRIDE, UFC, Pancrase, IFL, KOTC, WFA)
  Mike Whitehead - (UFC, Strikeforce, Affliction, M-1, IFL, WEC)
  Robert Whittaker - (UFC)
  Justin Wilcox - (Strikeforce, Bellator)
  Mike Wilkinson - (UFC)
  James Wilks - (UFC, KOTC)
  Jeremy Williams
  Joe Williams - (Bellator, KOTC)
  Patrick Williams - (UFC, XFC)
  Pete Williams - (RINGS, UFC, Pancrase, KOTC)
  Rubin Williams - (DREAM)
  Steve Williams - (K-1)
  Tedd Williams - (UFC, KOTC)
  Justin Willis - (UFC, WSOF)
  Chris Wilson - (KOTC, IFL, UFC, Shooto)
  Jonathan Wilson - (UFC)
  Matt Wiman - (UFC)
  Eddie Wineland - (UFC, WEC, Shooto)
  Andre Winner - (UFC, BAMMA, CWFC, Cage Rage, KSW)
  Shannon Wiratchai - (OneFC) 
  Eric Wisely - (UFC, Strikeforce, Bellator)
  Keith Wisniewski - (UFC, Shooto, IFL, M-1)
  Travis Wiuff - (Jungle Fight, Bellator, UFC, IFL, PRIDE, Sengoku, KOTC, YAMMA)
  Brandon Wolff - (K-1, UFC, WEC, EliteXC)
  Lloyd Woodard - (Bellator, Titan FC, KOTC)
  Tyron Woodley - (Strikeforce, UFC)
  Andrzej Wronski

Y
  Eddie Yagin - (UFC, WFA, PFC, TPF)
  Rani Yahya - (Jungle Fight, K-1 Hero's, PFC, WEC, UFC)
  Alexander Yakovlev - (M-1, Shooto, UFC)
  Manabu Yamada - (Pancrase, Shooto)
  Mikihito Yamagami - (Shooto, VTJ)
  Mamoru Yamaguchi - (Shooto, KOTC, VTJ, TPF)
  Keiichiro Yamamiya - (Pancrase, Sengoku, DEEP, UFC)
  Kenichi Yamamoto - (RINGS, PRIDE, UFC)
  Norifumi Yamamoto - (Shooto, K-1, K-1 Hero's, DREAM, UFC)
  Yoshihisa Yamamoto - (K-1 Hero's, RINGS, PRIDE, DEEP, VTJ)
  Goiti Yamauchi - (Bellator)
  Ryushi Yanagisawa - (Pancrase, RINGS, DEEP)
  Dongi Yang - (UFC, DEEP)
  Zhikui Yao - (UFC)
  Emmanuel Yarborough - (UFC, Shooto, PRIDE)
  Cale Yarbrough - (UFC, KOTC, Strikeforce)
  Tadao Yasuda - (PRIDE, K-1)
  Yoshiaki Yatsu - (PRIDE)
  Melvin Yeoh - (OneFC)
  Hirotaka Yokoi - (PRIDE, RINGS, DEEP, Shooto)
  Kazunori Yokota - (Pancrase, Sengoku, DEEP)
  Tetsuo Yokoyama - (Shooto)
  Dong Sik Yoon - (PRIDE, K-1 Hero's, DREAM)
  Jim York - (Sengoku, KOTC)
  Hidehiko Yoshida - (PRIDE, Sengoku)
  Yoshiyuki Yoshida - (Shooto, UFC, Bellator, OneFC, DEEP)
  Jason Young - (UFC, Cage Rage, CWFC)
  Savant Young - (IFL, Shooto, Affliction, Bellator, TPF)
  Gilbert Yvel - (RINGS, PRIDE, UFC, Affliction, M-1, K-1)

Z
  Luke Zachrich - (KOTC, Bellator, UFC)
  Marius Žaromskis - (Cage Rage, Strikeforce, Bellator, DREAM)
  Shamil Zavurov - (M-1, Bellator)
  Mikhail Zayats - (M-1, Bellator)
  Roman Zentsov - (M-1, PRIDE)
  Lipeng Zhang - (UFC, AOW)
  Tiequan Zhang - (UFC, WEC, AOW)
  Errol Zimmerman - (K-1)
  Catalin Zmarandescu - (BAMMA, K-1)
  Nikolai Zouev - (RINGS)
  Virgil Zwicker - (Bellator, Strikeforce, KSW)
  Drex Zamboanga - (URCC, ONE Championship)

See also
List of female mixed martial artists
List of bare-knuckle lightweight champions
List of male boxers
List of male kickboxers
List of undefeated mixed martial artists
Ultimate Fighting Championship Pound for Pound rankings

References

Male mixed martial artists
male mixed martial artists
Lists of sportsmen